= Photopolymer =

Resin that cures when exposed to light of appropriate wavelengths

A photopolymer or light-activated resin is a polymer that changes its properties when exposed to light, often in the ultraviolet or visible region of the electromagnetic spectrum. These changes are often manifested structurally, for example hardening of the material occurs as a result of cross-linking when exposed to light. An example is shown below depicting a mixture of monomers, oligomers, and photoinitiators that conform into a hardened polymeric material through a process called curing.

A wide variety of technologically useful applications rely on photopolymers; for example, some enamels and varnishes depend on photopolymer formulation for proper hardening upon exposure to light. In some instances, an enamel can cure in a fraction of a second when exposed to light, as opposed to thermally cured enamels which can require half an hour or longer. Curable materials are widely used for medical, printing, and photoresist technologies.

Changes in structural and chemical properties can be induced internally by chromophores that the polymer subunit already possesses, or externally by addition of photosensitive molecules. Typically a photopolymer consists of a mixture of multifunctional monomers and oligomers in order to achieve the desired physical properties, and therefore a wide variety of monomers and oligomers have been developed that can polymerize in the presence of light either through internal or external initiation. Photopolymers undergo a process called curing, where oligomers are cross-linked upon exposure to light, forming what is known as a network polymer. The result of photo-curing is the formation of a thermoset network of polymers. One of the advantages of photo-curing is that it can be done selectively using high energy light sources, for example lasers, however, most systems are not readily activated by light, and in this case a photoinitiator is required. Photoinitiators are compounds that upon radiation of light decompose into reactive species that activate polymerization of specific functional groups on the oligomers. An example of a mixture that undergoes cross-linking when exposed to light is shown below. The mixture consists of monomeric styrene and oligomeric acrylates.

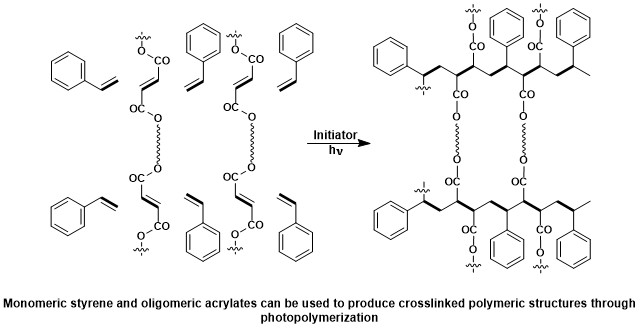
intro scheme for photopolymerization

Most commonly, photopolymerized systems are typically cured through UV radiation, since ultraviolet light is more energetic. However, the development of dye-based photoinitiator systems have allowed for the use of visible light, having the potential advantages of being simpler and safer to handle. UV curing in industrial processes has greatly expanded over the past several decades. Many traditional thermally cured and solvent-based technologies can be replaced by photopolymerization technologies. The advantages of photopolymerization over thermally cured polymerization include higher rates of polymerization and environmental benefits from elimination of volatile organic solvents.

There are two general routes for photoinitiation: free radical and ionic. The general process involves doping a batch of neat polymer with small amounts of photoinitiator, followed by selective radiation of light, resulting in a highly cross-linked product. Many of these reactions do not require solvent which eliminates termination path via reaction of initiators with solvent and impurities, in addition to decreasing the overall cost.

== Ionic mechanism ==
In ionic curing processes, an ionic photoinitiator is used to activate the functional group of the oligomers that are going to participate in cross-linking. Typically photopolymerization is a very selective process and it is crucial that the polymerization takes place only where it is desired to do so. In order to satisfy this, liquid neat oligomer can be doped with either anionic or cationic photoinitiators that will initiate polymerization only when radiated with light. Monomers, or functional groups, employed in cationic photopolymerization include: styrenic compounds, vinyl ethers, N-vinyl carbazoles, lactones, lactams, cyclic ethers, cyclic acetals, and cyclic siloxanes. The majority of ionic photoinitiators fall under the cationic class; anionic photoinitiators are considerably less investigated. There are several classes of cationic initiators, including onium salts, organometallic compounds and pyridinium salts. As mentioned earlier, one of the drawbacks of the photoinitiators used for photopolymerization is that they tend to absorb in the short UV region. Photosensitizers, or chromophores, that absorb in a much longer wavelength region can be employed to excite the photoinitiators through an energy transfer. Other modifications to these types of systems are free radical assisted cationic polymerization. In this case, a free radical is formed from another species in solution that reacts with the photoinitiator in order to start polymerization. Although there are a diverse group of compounds activated by cationic photoinitiators, the compounds that find most industrial uses contain epoxides, oxetanes, and vinyl ethers. One of the advantages to using cationic photopolymerization is that once the polymerization has begun it is no longer sensitive to oxygen and does not require an inert atmosphere to perform well.

Photolysis
$$\begin{matrix}{}\\
\ce{[R'-R+X^-] ->[hv] [R'-R+X-]^\ast -> R^{.+} + R'^. + X^- ->[\ce{MH}] {R+}-H + M-R' + X^- -> R + H+X^-}\\
{}\end{matrix}$$

M = Monomer

=== Cationic photoinitiators ===
The proposed mechanism for cationic photopolymerization begins with the photoexcitation of the initiator. Once excited, both homolytic cleavage and dissociation of a counter anion takes place, generating a cationic radical (R), an aryl radical (R') and an unaltered counter anion (X). The abstraction of a lewis acid by the cationic radical produces a very weakly bound hydrogen and a free radical. The acid is further deprotonated by the anion (X) in solution, generating a lewis acid with the starting anion (X) as a counter ion. It is thought that the acidic proton generated is what ultimately initiates the polymerization.

==== Onium salts ====
Since their discovery in the 1970s aryl onium salts, more specifically iodonium and sulfonium salts, have received much attention and have found many industrial applications. Other less common onium salts include ammonium and phosphonium salts.

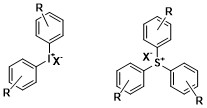
Onium Salts

A typical onium compound used as a photoinitiator contains two or three arene groups for iodonium and sulfonium respectively. Onium salts generally absorb short wavelength light in the UV region spanning from 225–300 nm. One characteristic that is crucial to the performance of the onium photoinitiators is that the counter anion is non-nucleophilic. Since the Brønsted acid generated during the initiation step is considered the active initiator for polymerization, there is a termination route where the counter ion of the acid could act as the nucleophile instead of a functional groups on the oligomer. Common counter anions include BF^{−}_{4}, PF^{−}_{6}, AsF^{−}_{6} and SbF^{−}_{6}. There is an indirect relationship between the size of the counter ion and percent conversion.

==== Organometallic ====
Although less common, transition metal complexes can act as cationic photoinitiators as well. In general, the mechanism is more simplistic than the onium ions previously described. Most photoinitiators of this class consist of a metal salt with a non-nucleophilic counter anion. For example, ferrocinium salts have received much attention for commercial applications. The absorption band for ferrocinium salt derivatives are in a much longer, and sometimes visible, region. Upon radiation the metal center loses one or more ligands and these are replaced by functional groups that begin the polymerization. One of the drawbacks of this method is a greater sensitivity to oxygen. There are also several organometallic anionic photoinitiators which react through a similar mechanism. For the anionic case, excitation of a metal center is followed by either heterolytic bond cleavage or electron transfer generating the active anionic initiator.

==== Pyridinium salts ====
Generally pyridinium photoinitiators are N-substituted pyridine derivatives, with a positive charge placed on the nitrogen. The counter ion is in most cases a non-nucleophilic anion. Upon radiation, homolytic bond cleavage takes place generating a pyridinium cationic radical and a neutral free radical. In most cases, a hydrogen atom is abstracted from the oligomer by the pyridinium radical. The free radical generated from the hydrogen abstraction is then terminated by the free radical in solution. This results in a strong pyridinium acid that can initiate polymerization.

== Free radical mechanism ==
Nowadays, most radical photopolymerization pathways are based on addition reactions of carbon double bonds in acrylates or methacrylates, and these pathways are widely employed in photolithography and stereolithography.

Before the free radical nature of certain polymerizations was determined, certain monomers were observed to polymerize when exposed to light. The first to demonstrate the photoinduced free radical chain reaction of vinyl bromide was Ivan Ostromislensky, a Russian chemist who also studied the polymerization of synthetic rubber. Subsequently, many compounds were found to become dissociated by light and found immediate use as photoinitiators in the polymerization industry.

In the free radical mechanism of radiation curable systems, light absorbed by a photoinitiator generates free-radicals which induce cross-linking reactions of a mixture of functionalized oligomers and monomers to generate the cured film.

Photocurable materials that form through the free-radical mechanism undergo chain-growth polymerization, which includes three basic steps: initiation, chain propagation, and chain termination. The three steps are depicted in the scheme below, where R• represents the radical that forms upon interaction with radiation during initiation, and M is a monomer. The active monomer that is formed is then propagated to create growing polymeric chain radicals. In photocurable materials the propagation step involves reactions of the chain radicals with reactive double bonds of the prepolymers or oligomers. The termination reaction usually proceeds through combination, in which two chain radicals are joined, or through disproportionation, which occurs when an atom (typically hydrogen) is transferred from one radical chain to another resulting in two polymeric chains.

Initiation
$$\begin{align}
Initiator + h_\nu &\ce{-> R^\bullet} \\
\ce{R^\bullet + M}\ &\ce{-> RM^\bullet}
\end{align}$$
Propagation
$$\ce{RM^\bullet + M_\mathit{n} -> RM^\bullet_{\mathit{n}+1}}$$
Termination
combination

$$\ce{RM^\bullet_\mathit{n} + ^\bullet M_\mathit{m}R -> RM_\mathit{n}M_\mathit{m}R}$$

disproportionation

$$\ce{RM^\bullet_\mathit{n} + ^\bullet M_\mathit{m}R -> RM_\mathit{n} + M_\mathit{m}R}$$

Most composites that cure through radical chain growth contain a diverse mixture of oligomers and monomers with functionality that can range from 2-8 and molecular weights from 500 to 3000. In general, monomers with higher functionality result in a tighter crosslinking density of the finished material. Typically these oligomers and monomers alone do not absorb sufficient energy for the commercial light sources used, therefore photoinitiators are included.

=== Free-radical photoinitiators ===
There are two types of free-radical photoinitators: A two component system where the radical is generated through abstraction of a hydrogen atom from a donor compound (also called co-initiator), and a one-component system where two radicals are generated by cleavage. Examples of each type of free-radical photoinitiator is shown below.

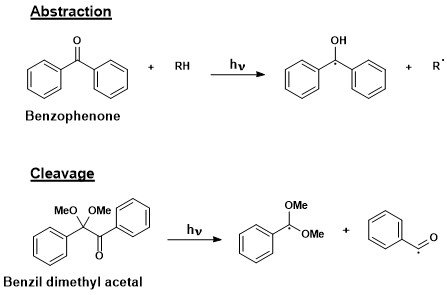
Free-rad types of photoinitiators1

Benzophenone, xanthones, and quinones are examples of abstraction type photoinitiators, with common donor compounds being aliphatic amines. The resulting R• species from the donor compound becomes the initiator for the free radical polymerization process, while the radical resulting from the starting photoinitiator (benzophenone in the example shown above) is typically unreactive.

Benzoin ethers, Acetophenones, Benzoyl Oximes, and Acylphosphines are some examples of cleavage-type photoinitiators. Cleavage readily occurs for the species, giving two radicals upon absorption of light, and both radicals generated can typically initiate polymerization. Cleavage type photoinitiators do not require a co-initiator, such as aliphatic amines. This can be beneficial since amines are also effective chain transfer species. Chain-transfer processes reduce the chain length and ultimately the crosslink density of the resulting film.

== Oligomers and monomers ==
The properties of a photocured material, such as flexibility, adhesion, and chemical resistance, are provided by the functionalized oligomers present in the photocurable composite. Oligomers are typically epoxides, urethanes, polyethers, or polyesters, each of which provide specific properties to the resulting material. Each of these oligomers are typically functionalized by an acrylate. An example shown below is an epoxy oligomer that has been functionalized by acrylic acid. Acrylated epoxies are useful as coatings on metallic substrates and result in glossy hard coatings. Acrylated urethane oligomers are typically abrasion resistant, tough, and flexible, making ideal coatings for floors, paper, printing plates, and packaging materials. Acrylated polyethers and polyesters result in very hard solvent resistant films, however, polyethers are prone to UV degradation and therefore are rarely used in UV curable material. Often formulations are composed of several types of oligomers to achieve the desirable properties for a material.

Acrylated epoxy oligomer

The monomers used in radiation curable systems help control the speed of cure, crosslink density, final surface properties of the film, and viscosity of the resin. Examples of monomers include styrene, N-Vinylpyrrolidone, and acrylates. Styrene is a low cost monomer and provides a fast cure, N-vinylpyrrolidone results in a material that is highly flexible when cured and has low toxicity, and acrylates are highly reactive, allowing for rapid cure rates, and are highly versatile with monomer functionality ranging from monofunctional to tetrafunctional. Like oligomers, several types of monomers can be employed to achieve the desired properties of the final material.

== Reversible crosslinking in photopolymers ==
Utilization of dynamic covalent bonding in the field of photopolymers has resulted in several approaches to making chemically reversible polymer crosslinks. Polymers which exhibit dynamic covalent bonding allow for materials to restructure their crosslinks, while preserving the oligomer Network, thus their mechanical properties tend to be preserved through several cycles of recycling. One of the more notable approaches for creating dynamic covalent bonds is through the introduction of Hindered Urea Bonds (HUB) to the system. Variable steric bulk introduced upon a nitrogen interrupts in-plane orbital interactions, weakening the urea bond. This makes the crosslinks more subject to reversibility, or otherwise "dynamic". To understand the limits of the role of HUBs in thermal reprocessibility, a general guiding principle has been put forth for HUB-containing systems which says that when a system is more than 50% alkyl-Urea bonds, thermal reprocessing will be favorable, and when a system is less than 50% alkyl-urea bonds, the network will not be thermally reprocessable.

Dynamic Covalent Networks (CANs) are establishable in a multitude of ways beyond introducing HUBs; the most notable early CANs utilized disulfide metathesis, or transalkylation approaches. Both approaches, Disulfide Metathesis and transalkylation, exhibit dynamic covalent bonding, however, each results in a stronger crosslinking bond compared to HUB-containing systems. In the case of Disulfide metathesis, it is common for temperatures to exceed 100 centigrade for reprocessing, however the approach has been successfully tailored to produce polymer systems that are reprocessable at room temperature. Transalkylation approaches have, thus far, been dependent on external catalysts or temperatures exceeding 100 centigrade, or a combination of both. Herein lies the reason HUB-containing, and other novel CANs have received a swell of attention over the last two decades; these systems demonstrate a tuneable polymer which can be depolymerized and repolymerized under room temperature conditions and without an additive catalyst, both of which work favorably to reduce industrial costs of polymer reprocessing.

== Applications ==
Photopolymerization has wide-ranging applications, from imaging to biomedical uses.

=== Dentistry ===
Dentistry is one field in which free radical photopolymers have found wide usage as adhesives, sealant composites, and protective coatings. These dental composites are based on a camphorquinone photoinitiator and a matrix containing methacrylate oligomers with inorganic fillers such as silicon dioxide. Resin cements are utilized in luting cast ceramic, full porcelain, and veneer restorations that are thin or translucent, which permits visible light penetration in order to polymerize the cement. Light-activated cements may be radiolucent and are usually provided in various shades since they are utilized in esthetically demanding situations.

Conventional halogen bulbs, argon lasers and xenon arc lights are currently used in clinical practice. A new technological approach for curing light-activated oral biomaterials using a light curing unit (LCU) is based on blue light-emitting diodes (LED). The main benefits of LED LCU technology are the long lifetime of LED LCUs (several thousand hours), no need for filters or a cooling fan, and virtually no decrease of light output over the lifetime of the unit, resulting in consistent and high quality curing. Simple depth of cure experiments on dental composites cured with LED technology show promising results.

=== Medical uses ===
Photocurable adhesives are also used in the production of catheters, hearing aids, surgical masks, medical filters, and blood analysis sensors. Photopolymers have also been explored for uses in drug delivery, tissue engineering and cell encapsulation systems. Photopolymerization processes for these applications are being developed to be carried out in vivo or ex vivo. In vivo photopolymerization would provide the advantages of production and implantation with minimal invasive surgery. Ex vivo photopolymerization would allow for fabrication of complex matrices and versatility of formulation. Although photopolymers show promise for a wide range of new biomedical applications, biocompatibility with photopolymeric materials must still be addressed and developed.

=== 3D printing ===
Stereolithography, digital imaging, and 3D inkjet printing are just a few 3D printing technologies that make use of photopolymerization pathways. 3D printing usually utilizes CAD-CAM software, which creates a 3D computer model to be translated into a 3D plastic object. The image is cut in slices; each slice is then reconstructed through radiation curing of the liquid polymer, converting the image into a solid object. Photopolymers used in 3D imaging processes require sufficient cross-linking and should ideally be designed to have minimal volume shrinkage upon polymerization in order to avoid distortion of the solid object. Common monomers utilized for 3D imaging include multifunctional acrylates and methacrylates, often combined with a non-polymeric component in order to reduce volume shrinkage. A competing composite mixture of epoxide resins with cationic photoinitiators is becoming increasingly used since their volume shrinkage upon ring-opening polymerization is significantly below those of acrylates and methacrylates. Free-radical and cationic polymerizations composed of both epoxide and acrylate monomers have also been employed, gaining the high rate of polymerization from the acrylic monomer, and better mechanical properties from the epoxy matrix.

Continuous Liquid Interface Production (CLIP) accessed printing speeds of 500 mm/hour and achieved resolutions below 100 micrometers. This methodology introduces an oxygen-permeable, UV-Transparent interfacial window, providing a narrow layer of space where radical polymerization is inhibited by molecular oxygen. Pathways of inhibition include, the quenching of the photo-initiator's excited state, or the formation of a peroxide upon interaction with an active propagation site. Following quenching, the continuous raising of the build platform induces a vacuum and draws in more monomer for a subsequent UV layer projection.

=== Photoresists ===
Photoresists are coatings, or oligomers, that are deposited on a surface and are designed to change properties upon irradiation of light. These changes either polymerize the liquid oligomers into insoluble cross-linked network polymers or decompose the already solid polymers into liquid products. Polymers that form networks during photopolymerization are referred to as negative resist. Conversely, polymers that decompose during photopolymerization are referred to as positive resists. Both positive and negative resists have found many applications including the design and production of micro-fabricated chips. The ability to pattern the resist using a focused light source has driven the field of photolithography.

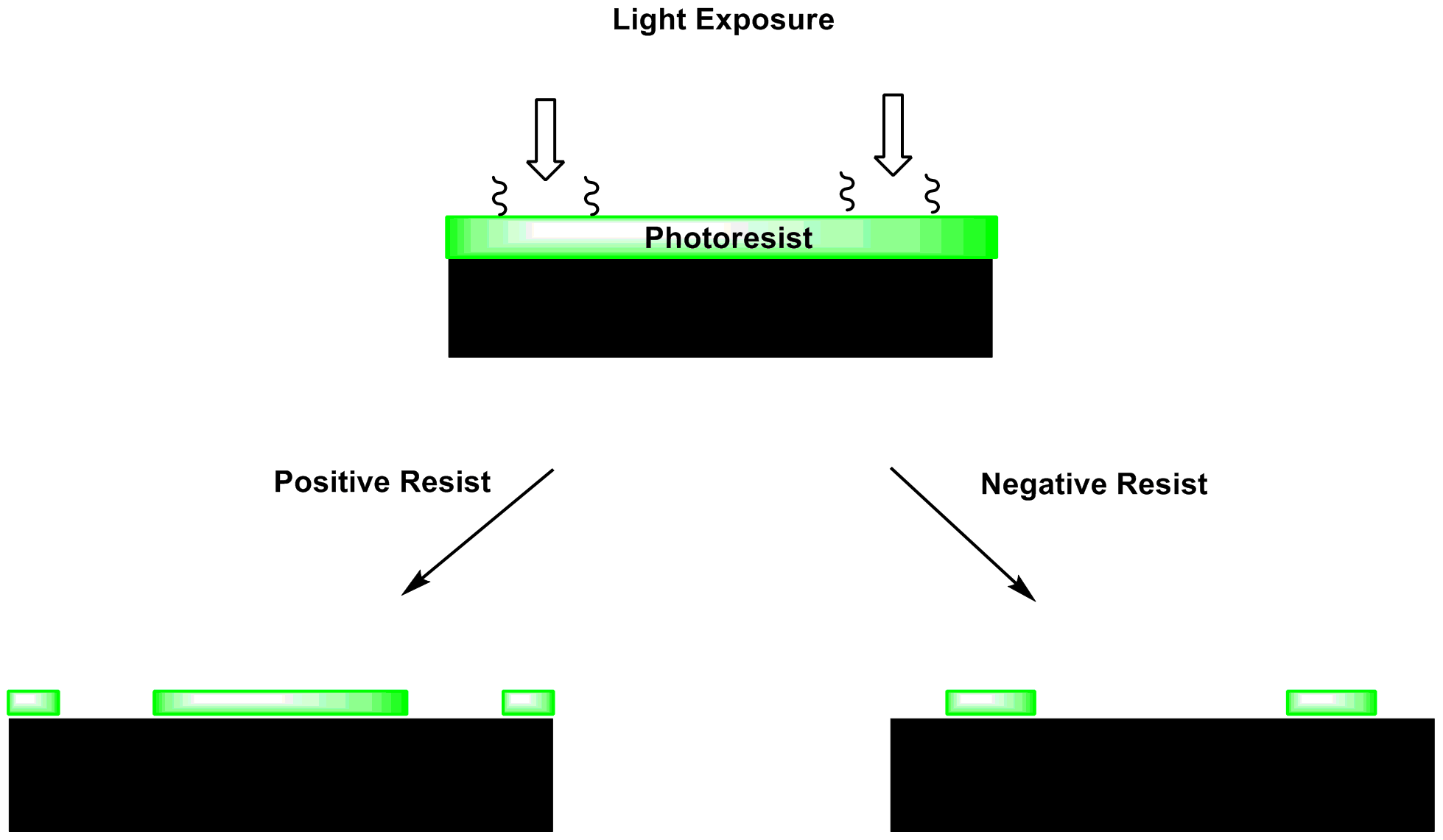
Differences between negative and positive photoresist

==== Negative resists ====
As mentioned, negative resists are photopolymers that become insoluble upon exposure to radiation. They have found a variety of commercial applications, especially in the area of designing and printing small chips for electronics. A characteristic found in most negative tone resists is the presence of multifunctional branches on the polymers used. Radiation of the polymers in the presence of an initiator results in the formation of a chemically resistant network polymer. A common functional group used in negative resists is epoxy functional groups. An example of a widely used polymer of this class is SU-8. SU-8 was one of the first polymers used in this field, and found applications in wire board printing. In the presence of a cationic photoinitiator photopolymer, SU-8 forms networks with other polymers in solution. Basic scheme shown below.

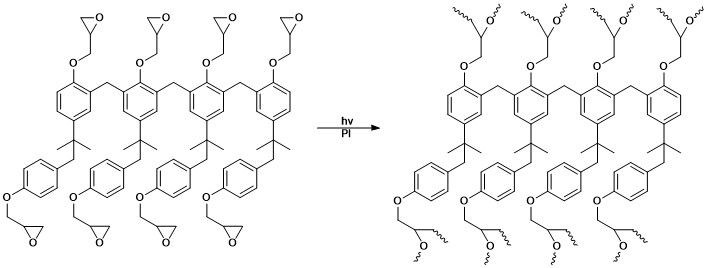
SU-8 photopolymerization

SU-8 is an example of an intramolecular photopolymerization forming a matrix of cross-linked material. Negative resists can also be made using co-polymerization. In the event that two different monomers, or oligomers, are in solution with multiple functionalities, it is possible for the two to polymerize and form a less soluble polymer.

Manufacturers also use light curing systems in OEM assembly applications such as specialty electronics or medical device applications.

==== Positive resists ====
Exposure of a positive resist to radiation changes the chemical structure such that it becomes a liquid or more soluble. These changes in chemical structure are often rooted in the cleavage of specific linkers in the polymer. Once irradiated, the "decomposed" polymers can be washed away using a developer solvent leaving behind the polymer that was not exposed to light. This type of technology allows the production of very fine stencils for applications such as microelectronics. In order to have these types of qualities, positive resists utilize polymers with labile linkers in their back bone that can be cleaved upon irradiation, or use a photo-generated acid to hydrolyze bonds in the polymer. A polymer that decomposes upon irradiation to a liquid or more soluble product is referred to as a positive tone resist. Common functional groups that can be hydrolyzed by a photo-generated acid catalyst include polycarbonates and polyesters.

=== Fine printing ===
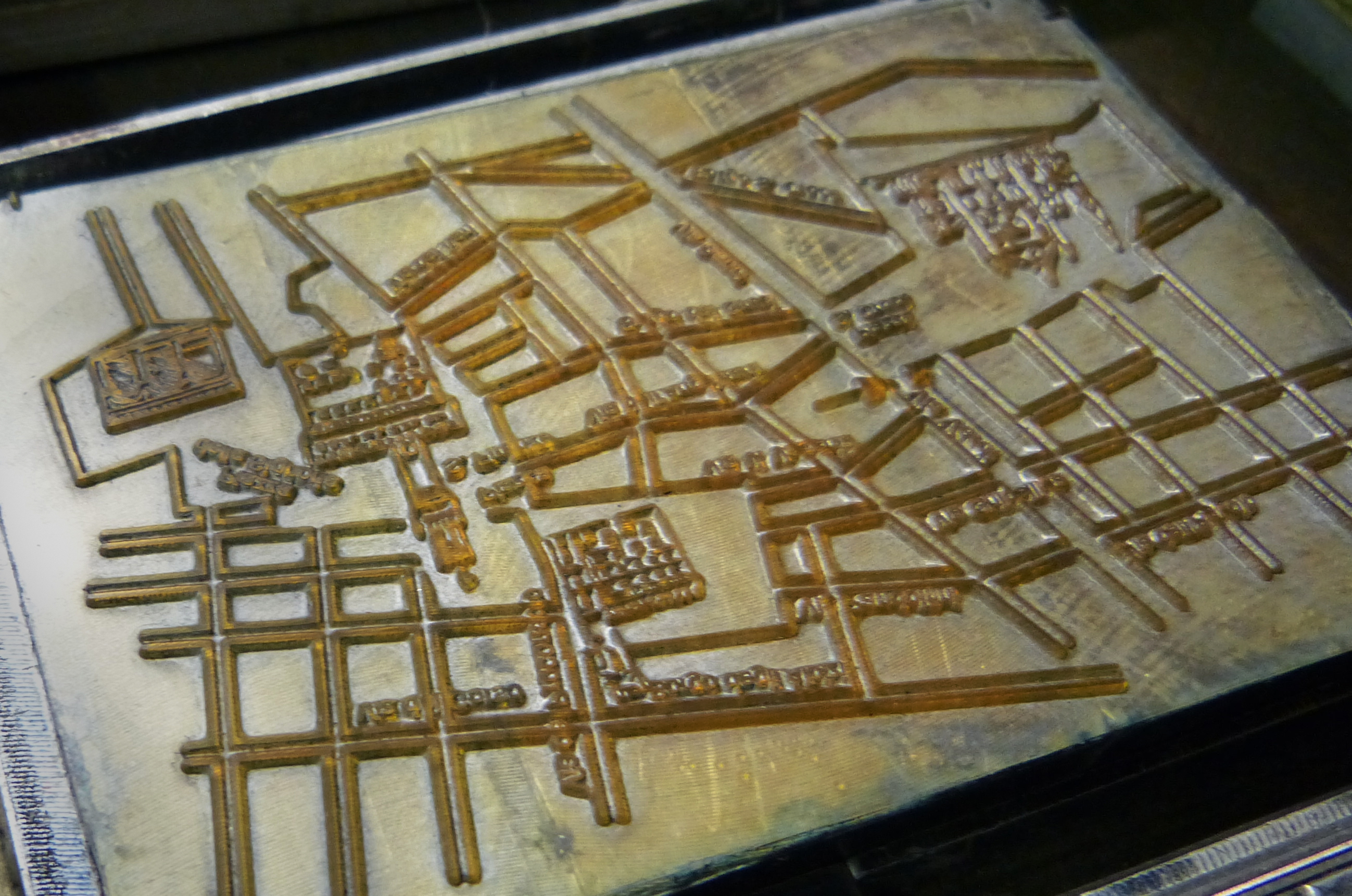
A printing plate of a city map created in photopolymer

Photopolymers can be used to generate printing plates, which are then pressed onto paper-like metal type. This is often used in modern fine printing to achieve the effect of embossing (or the more subtly three-dimensional effect of letterpress printing) from designs created on a computer without needing to engrave designs into metal or cast metal type. It is often used for business cards.

=== Repairing leaks ===
Industrial facilities are utilizing light-activated resin as a sealant for leaks and cracks. Some light-activated resins have unique properties that make them ideal as a pipe repair product. These resins cure rapidly on any wet or dry surface.

=== Fishing ===
Light-activated resins recently gained a foothold with fly tiers as a way to create custom flies in a short period of time, with very little cleanup involved.

=== Floor refinishing ===
Light-activated resins have found a place in floor refinishing applications, offering an instant return to service not available with any other chemical due to the need to cure at ambient temperatures. Because of application constraints, these coatings are exclusively UV cured with portable equipment containing high intensity discharge lamps. Such UV coatings are now commercially available for a variety of substrates, such as wood, vinyl composition tile and concrete, replacing traditional polyurethanes for wood refinishing and low durability acrylics for VCT.
