= Chain reaction =

Self-amplifying chain of events

A chain reaction is a sequence of reactions where a reactive product or by-product causes additional reactions to take place. In a chain reaction, positive feedback leads to a self-amplifying chain of events.

Chain reactions are one way that systems which are not in thermodynamic equilibrium can release energy or increase entropy in order to reach a state of higher entropy. For example, a system may not be able to reach a lower energy state by releasing energy into the environment, because it is hindered or prevented in some way from taking the path that will result in the energy release. If a reaction results in a small energy release making way for more energy releases in an expanding chain, then the system will typically collapse explosively until much or all of the stored energy has been released.

A macroscopic metaphor for chain reactions is thus a snowball causing a larger snowball until finally an avalanche results ("snowball effect"). This is a result of stored gravitational potential energy seeking a path of release over friction. Chemically, the equivalent to a snow avalanche is a spark causing a forest fire. In nuclear physics, a single stray neutron can result in a prompt critical event, which may finally be energetic enough for a nuclear reactor meltdown or (in a bomb) a nuclear explosion.

Another metaphor for a chain reaction is the domino effect, named after the act of domino toppling, where the simple action of toppling one domino leads to all dominoes eventually toppling, even if they are significantly larger.

Numerous chain reactions can be represented by a mathematical model based on Markov chains.

== Chemical chain reactions ==
=== History ===
In 1913, the German chemist Max Bodenstein first put forth the idea of chemical chain reactions. If two molecules react, not only molecules of the final reaction products are formed, but also some unstable molecules which can further react with the parent molecules with a far larger probability than the initial reactants. (In the new reaction, further unstable molecules are formed besides the stable products, and so on.)

In 1918, Walther Nernst proposed that the photochemical reaction between hydrogen and chlorine is a chain reaction in order to explain what is known as the quantum yield phenomena. This means that one photon of light is responsible for the formation of as many as 10^{6} molecules of the product HCl. Nernst suggested that the photon dissociates a Cl_{2} molecule into two Cl atoms which each initiate a long chain of reaction steps forming HCl.

In 1923, Danish and Dutch scientists J. A. Christiansen and Hendrik Anthony Kramers, in an analysis of the formation of polymers, pointed out that such a chain reaction need not start with a molecule excited by light, but could also start with two molecules colliding violently due to thermal energy as previously proposed for initiation of chemical reactions by van' t Hoff.

Christiansen and Kramers also noted that if, in one link of the reaction chain, two or more unstable molecules are produced, the reaction chain would branch and grow. The result is in fact an exponential growth, thus giving rise to explosive increases in reaction rates, and indeed to chemical explosions themselves. This was the first proposal for the mechanism of chemical explosions.

A quantitative chain chemical reaction theory was created later on by Soviet physicist Nikolay Semyonov in 1934. Semyonov shared the Nobel Prize in 1956 with Sir Cyril Norman Hinshelwood, who independently developed many of the same quantitative concepts.

=== Typical steps ===
The main types of steps in chain reaction are of the following types.

- Initiation (formation of active particles or chain carriers, often free radicals, in either a thermal or a photochemical step)
- Propagation (may comprise several elementary steps in a cycle, where the active particle through reaction forms another active particle which continues the reaction chain by entering the next elementary step). In effect the active particle serves as a catalyst for the overall reaction of the propagation cycle. Particular cases are:
  - chain branching (a propagation step where one active particle enters the step and two or more are formed);
  - chain transfer (a propagation step in which the active particle is a growing polymer chain which reacts to form an inactive polymer whose growth is terminated and an active small particle (such as a radical), which may then react to form a new polymer chain).
- Termination (elementary step in which the active particle loses its activity; e. g. by recombination of two free radicals).

The chain length is defined as the average number of times the propagation cycle is repeated, and equals the overall reaction rate divided by the initiation rate.

Some chain reactions have complex rate equations with fractional order or mixed order kinetics.

=== Detailed example: the hydrogen-bromine reaction ===
The reaction H_{2} + Br_{2} → 2 HBr proceeds by the following mechanism:

- Initiation

Br_{2} → 2 Br• (thermal) or Br_{2} + hν → 2 Br• (photochemical)
each Br atom is a free radical, indicated by the symbol "•" representing an unpaired electron.

- Propagation (here a cycle of two steps)

Br• + H_{2} → HBr + H•
H• + Br_{2} → HBr + Br•
the sum of these two steps corresponds to the overall reaction H_{2} + Br_{2} → 2 HBr, with catalysis by Br• which participates in the first step and is regenerated in the second step.

- Retardation (inhibition)

H• + HBr → H_{2} + Br•
this step is specific to this example, and corresponds to the first propagation step in reverse.

- Termination 2 Br• → Br_{2}

recombination of two radicals, corresponding in this example to initiation in reverse.

As can be explained using the steady-state approximation, the thermal reaction has an initial rate of fractional order (3/2), and a complete rate equation with a two-term denominator (mixed-order kinetics).

=== Further chemical examples ===
- The reaction 2 H_{2} + O_{2} → 2 H_{2}O provides an example of chain branching. The propagation is a sequence of two steps whose net effect is to replace an H atom by another H atom plus two OH radicals. This leads to an explosion under certain conditions of temperature and pressure.
  - H• + O_{2} → •OH + •O•
  - •O• + H_{2} → •OH + H•
- In chain-growth polymerization, the propagation step corresponds to the elongation of the growing polymer chain. Chain transfer corresponds to transfer of the activity from this growing chain, whose growth is terminated, to another molecule which may be a second growing polymer chain. For polymerization, the kinetic chain length defined above may differ from the degree of polymerization of the product macromolecule.
- Polymerase chain reaction, a technique used in molecular biology to amplify (make many copies of) a piece of DNA by in vitro enzymatic replication using a DNA polymerase.

=== Acetaldehyde pyrolysis and rate equation ===
The pyrolysis (thermal decomposition) of acetaldehyde, CH_{3}CHO (g) → CH_{4} (g) + CO (g), proceeds via the Rice-Herzfeld mechanism:

- Initiation (formation of free radicals):

CH_{3}CHO (g) → •CH_{3} (g) + •CHO (g) k_{1}

The methyl and CHO groups are free radicals.

- Propagation (two steps):

•CH_{3} (g) + CH_{3}CHO (g) → CH_{4} (g) + •CH_{3}CO (g) k_{2}

This reaction step provides methane, which is one of the two main products.

•CH_{3}CO (g) → CO (g) + •CH_{3} (g) k_{3}

The product •CH_{3}CO (g) of the previous step gives rise to carbon monoxide (CO), which is the second main product.

The sum of the two propagation steps corresponds to the overall reaction CH_{3}CHO (g) → CH_{4} (g) + CO (g), catalyzed by a methyl radical •CH_{3}.

- Termination:

•CH_{3} (g) + •CH_{3} (g) → C_{2}H_{6} (g) k_{4}

This reaction is the only source of ethane (minor product) and it is concluded to be the main chain ending step.

Although this mechanism explains the principal products, there are others that are formed in a minor degree, such as acetone (CH_{3}COCH_{3}) and propanal (CH_{3}CH_{2}CHO).

Applying the Steady State Approximation for the intermediate species CH_{3}(g) and CH_{3}CO(g), the rate law for the formation of methane and the order of reaction are found:

The rate of formation of the product methane is

$(1)... \frac{d\ce{[CH4]}}{dt} = k_2\ce{[CH3]} \ce{[CH3CHO]}$

For the intermediates

$(2)... \frac{d\ce{[CH_3]}}{dt} = k_1 \ce{[CH3CHO]} - k_2 \ce{[CH3]} \ce{[CH3CHO]} + k_3 \ce{[CH3CO]} - 2 k_4 \ce{[CH3]}^2 = 0$ and

$(3)... \frac{d\ce{[CH3CO]}}{dt} = k_2 \ce{[CH3]} \ce{[CH3CHO]} - k_3 \ce{[CH3CO]} = 0$

Adding (2) and (3), we obtain $k_1 \ce{[CH3CHO]} - 2 k_4 \ce{[CH3]}^2 = 0$

so that $(4)...\ce{[CH3]} = \frac{k_1}{2k_4}\ce{[CH3CHO]}^{1/2}$

Using (4) in (1) gives the rate law $(5) \frac{d\ce{[CH4]}}{dt} = \frac{k_1}{2k_4} k_2 \ce{[CH3CHO]}^{3/2}$, which is order 3/2 in the reactant CH_{3}CHO.

== Nuclear chain reactions ==
A nuclear chain reaction was proposed by Leo Szilard in 1933, shortly after the neutron was discovered, yet more than five years before nuclear fission was first discovered. Szilárd knew of chemical chain reactions, and he had been reading about an energy-producing nuclear reaction involving high-energy protons bombarding lithium, demonstrated by John Cockcroft and Ernest Walton, in 1932. Now, Szilárd proposed to use neutrons theoretically produced from certain nuclear reactions in lighter isotopes, to induce further reactions in light isotopes that produced more neutrons. This would in theory produce a chain reaction at the level of the nucleus. He did not envision fission as one of these neutron-producing reactions, since this reaction was not known at the time. Experiments he proposed using beryllium and indium failed.

Later, after fission was discovered in 1938, Szilárd immediately realized the possibility of using neutron-induced fission as the particular nuclear reaction necessary to create a chain-reaction, so long as fission also produced neutrons. In 1939, with Enrico Fermi, Szilárd proved this neutron-multiplying reaction in uranium. In this reaction, a neutron plus a fissionable atom causes a fission resulting in a larger number of neutrons than the single one that was consumed in the initial reaction. Thus was born the practical nuclear chain reaction by the mechanism of neutron-induced nuclear fission.

Specifically, if one or more of the produced neutrons themselves interact with other fissionable nuclei, and these also undergo fission, then there is a possibility that the macroscopic overall fission reaction will not stop, but continue throughout the reaction material. This is then a self-propagating and thus self-sustaining chain reaction. This is the principle for nuclear reactors and atomic bombs.

Demonstration of a self-sustaining nuclear chain reaction was accomplished by Enrico Fermi and others, in the successful operation of Chicago Pile-1, the first artificial nuclear reactor, in late 1942.

== Electron avalanche in gases ==
An electron avalanche happens between two unconnected electrodes in a gas when an electric field exceeds a certain threshold. Random thermal collisions of gas atoms may result in a few free electrons and positively charged gas ions, in a process called impact ionization. Acceleration of these free electrons in a strong electric field causes them to gain energy, and when they impact other atoms, the energy causes release of new free electrons and ions (ionization), which fuels the same process. If this process happens faster than it is naturally quenched by ions recombining, the new ions multiply in successive cycles until the gas breaks down into a plasma and current flows freely in a discharge.

Electron avalanches are essential to the dielectric breakdown process within gases. The process can culminate in corona discharges, streamers, leaders, or in a spark or continuous electric arc that completely bridges the gap. The process may extend huge sparks — streamers in lightning discharges propagate by formation of electron avalanches created in the high potential gradient ahead of the streamers' advancing tips. Once begun, avalanches are often intensified by the creation of photoelectrons as a result of ultraviolet radiation emitted by the excited medium's atoms in the aft-tip region. The extremely high temperature of the resulting plasma cracks the surrounding gas molecules and the free ions recombine to create new chemical compounds.

The process can also be used to detect radiation that initiates the process, as the passage of a single particles can be amplified to large discharges. This is the mechanism of a Geiger counter and also the visualization possible with a spark chamber and other wire chambers.

== Avalanche breakdown in semiconductors ==
An avalanche breakdown process can happen in semiconductors, which in some ways conduct electricity analogously to a mildly ionized gas. Semiconductors rely on free electrons knocked out of the crystal by thermal vibration for conduction. Thus, unlike metals, semiconductors become better conductors the higher the temperature. This sets up conditions for the same type of positive feedback—heat from current flow causes temperature to rise, which increases charge carriers, lowering resistance, and causing more current to flow. This can continue to the point of complete breakdown of normal resistance at a semiconductor junction, and failure of the device (this may be temporary or permanent depending on whether there is physical damage to the crystal). Certain devices, such as avalanche diodes, deliberately make use of the effect.

== Living organisms ==
Examples of chain reactions in living organisms include excitation of neurons in epilepsy and lipid peroxidation. In peroxidation, a lipid radical reacts with oxygen to form a peroxyl radical (L• + O_{2} → LOO•). The peroxyl radical then oxidises another lipid, thus forming another lipid radical (LOO• + L–H → LOOH + L•). A chain reaction in glutamatergic synapses is the cause of synchronous discharge in some epileptic seizures.

== See also ==
- Cascading failure
- Multiple-vehicle collision
- Rube Goldberg machine
