= Ionic polymerization =

Chain polymerization in which active centers are ions or ion pairs

IUPAC definition

Chain polymerization in which active centers are ions or ion pairs.

Note 1: Usually the chain-ends are ions, although ions can also be located ionic

on the monomer molecules, as in an activated-monomer polymerization.

Note 2: The ions may also be present in the form of higher aggregates

that usually are less reactive than non-aggregated species.

Modified from the earlier definition.

— Penczek S.; Moad, G. Pure Appl. Chem., 2008, 80(10), 2163-2193

In polymer chemistry, ionic polymerization is a chain-growth polymerization in which active centers are ions or ion pairs. It can be considered as an alternative to radical polymerization, and may refer to anionic polymerization or cationic polymerization.

As with radical polymerization, reactions are initiated by a reactive compound. For cationic polymerization, titanium-, boron-, aluminum-, and tin-halide complexes with water, alcohols, or oxonium salts are useful as initiators, as well as strong acids and salts such as KHSO_{4}. Meanwhile, group 1 metals such as lithium, sodium, and potassium, and their organic compounds (e.g. sodium naphthalene) serve as effective anionic initiators. In both anionic and cationic polymerization, each charged chain end (negative and positive, respectively) is matched by a counterion of opposite charge that originates from the initiator. Because of the charge stability necessary in ionic polymerization, monomers which may be polymerized by this method are few compared to those available for free radical polymerization. Stable polymerizing cations are only possible using monomers with electron-releasing groups, and stable anions with monomers with electron-withdrawing groups as substituents.

While radical polymerization rate is governed nearly exclusively by monomer chemistry and radical stability, successful ionic polymerization is as strongly related to reaction conditions. Poor monomer purity quickly leads to early termination, and solvent polarity has a great effect on reaction rate. Loosely-coordinated and solvated ion pairs promote more reactive, fast-polymerizing chains, unencumbered by their counterions. Unfortunately, molecules that are polar enough to support these solvated ion pairs often interrupt the polymerization in other ways, such as by destroying propagating species or coordinating with initiator ions, and so they are seldom utilized. Typical solvents for ionic polymerization include non-polar molecules such as pentane, or moderately polar molecules such as chloroform.

== History ==
The potential utility of ionic polymerization was first recorded by Michael Szwarc after a conversation with Samuel Weissman. He and a team, composed of Moshe Levy and Ralph Milkovich, attempted to recreate an experiment performed by Weissman to study the electron affinity of styrene. By adding styrene monomer to a solution of sodium naphthalenide and Tetrahydrofuran, the "olive-green" solution became a "cherry-red" and appeared to continue to react with new additions of styrene even minutes after the last. This observation, coupled with the determination that the product was polystyrene, indicated that a living, anionic polymerization had been initiated by the addition of electrons.

== Applications ==
Because of the polarity of the active group on each polymerizing radical, termination by chain combination is not seen in ionic polymerization. Furthermore, because charge propagation can only occur by covalent bond formation with the compatible monomer species, termination by chain transfer or disproportionation is impossible. This means that all polymerizing ions, unlike in radical polymerization, grow and maintain their chain lengths throughout the reaction duration (so-called "living" polymer chains), until termination by the addition of a terminating molecule such as water. This leads to virtually monodisperse polymer products, which have many applications in material analysis and product design. Furthermore, because the ions do not self-terminate, block copolymers may be formed by the addition of a new monomer species.

A few important uses of anionic polymerization include the following:

- Calibration standards for gel permeation chromatography
- Microphase separating block copolymers
- Thermoplastic elastomeric materials
