= Kinetic chain length =

Average number of monomers added during chain-growth polymerization

In polymer chemistry, the kinetic chain length (ν) of a polymer is the average number of units called monomers added to a growing chain during chain-growth polymerization. During this process, a polymer chain is formed when monomers are bonded together to form long chains known as polymers. Kinetic chain length is defined as the average number of monomers that react with an active center such as a radical, an anion or a cation, from initiation to termination.

This definition is a special case of the concept of chain length in chemical kinetics. For any chemical chain reaction, the chain length is defined as the average number of times that the closed cycle of chain propagation steps is repeated. It is equal to the rate of the overall reaction divided by the rate of the initiation step in which the chain carriers are formed. For example, the decomposition of ozone in water is a chain reaction which has been described in terms of its chain length.

In chain-growth polymerization the propagation step is the addition of a monomer to the growing chain. The word kinetic is added to chain length in order to distinguish the number of reaction steps in the kinetic chain from the number of monomers in the final macromolecule, a quantity named the degree of polymerization. In fact the kinetic chain length is one factor which influences the average degree of polymerization, but there are other factors as described below. The kinetic chain length and therefore the degree of polymerization can influence certain physical properties of the polymer, including chain mobility, glass-transition temperature, and modulus of elasticity.

== Calculating chain length ==
For most chain-growth polymerizations, the propagation steps are much faster than the initiation steps, so that each growing chain is formed in a short time compared to the overall polymerization reaction. During the formation of a single chain, the reactant concentrations and therefore the propagation rate remain effectively constant. Under these conditions, the ratio of the number of propagation steps to the number of initiation steps is just the ratio of reaction rates:

$$\nu = \frac{R_p}{R_i} = \frac{R_p}{R_t}$$

where R_{p} is the rate of propagation, R_{i} is the rate of initiation of polymerization, and R_{t} is the rate of termination of the polymer chain. The second form of the equation is valid at steady-state polymerization, as the chains are being initiated at the same rate they are being terminated (R_{i} = R_{t}).

An exception is the class of living polymerizations, in which propagation is much slower than initiation, and chain termination does not occur until a quenching agent is added. In such reactions the reactant monomer is slowly consumed and the propagation rate varies and is not used to obtain the kinetic chain length. Instead the length at a given time is usually written as:

$$\nu = \frac{[\ce{M}]_0-[\ce{M}]}{[\ce{I}]_0}$$

where [M]_{0} – [M] represents the number of monomer units consumed, and [I]_{0} the number of radicals that initiate polymerization. When the reaction goes to completion, [M] = 0, and then the kinetic chain length is equal to the number average degree of polymerization of the polymer.

In both cases kinetic chain length is an average quantity, as not all polymer chains in a given reaction are identical in length. The value of ν depends on the nature and concentration of both the monomer and initiator involved.

== Kinetic chain length and degree of polymerization ==
In chain-growth polymerization, the degree of polymerization depends not only on the kinetic chain length but also on the type of termination step and the possibility of chain transfer.

=== Termination by disproportionation ===
Termination by disproportionation occurs when an atom is transferred from one polymer free radical to another. The atom is usually hydrogen, and this results in two polymer chains.

With this type of termination and no chain transfer, the number average degree of polymerization (DP_{n}) is then equal to the average kinetic chain length:

$$DP_n = \nu$$

=== Termination by combination ===
Combination simply means that two radicals are joined together, destroying the radical character of each and forming one polymeric chain. With no chain transfer, the average degree of polymerization is then twice the average kinetic chain length

$$DP_n = 2 \nu$$

=== Chain transfer ===
Some chain-growth polymerizations include chain transfer steps, in which another atom (often hydrogen) is transferred from a molecule in the system to the polymer radical. The original polymer chain is terminated and a new one is initiated. The kinetic chain is not terminated if the new radical can add monomer. However the degree of polymerization is reduced without affecting the rate of polymerization (which depends on kinetic chain length), since two (or more) macromolecules are formed instead of one. For the case of termination by disproportionation, the degree of polymerization becomes:

$$DP_n = \frac{R_p}{R_t + R_{tr}} < \nu = \frac{R_p}{R_t}$$

where R_{tr} is the rate of transfer. The greater R_{tr} is, the shorter the final macromolecule.

== Significance ==
The kinetic chain length is important in determining the degree of polymerization, which in turn influences many physical properties of the polymer.

- Viscosity - Chain entanglements are very important in viscous flow behavior (viscosity) of polymers. As the chain becomes longer, chain mobility decreases; that is, the chains become more entangled with each other.
- Glass-transition temperature - An increase in chain length often leads to an increase in the glass-transition temperature, T_{g}. The increased chain length causes the chains to become more entangled at a given temperature. Therefore, the temperature does not need to be as low for the material to act as a solid.
- Modulus of Elasticity - A longer chain length is also associated with a material tends to be tougher and has a higher modulus of elasticity, E, also known as the Young's modulus. The interaction of the chains causes the polymer to become stiffer.
