= Sequence analysis of synthetic polymers =

The methods for sequence analysis of synthetic polymers differ from the sequence analysis of biopolymers (e. g. DNA or proteins). Synthetic polymers are produced by chain-growth or step-growth polymerization and show thereby polydispersity, whereas biopolymers are synthesized by complex template-based mechanisms and are sequence-defined and monodisperse. Synthetic polymers are a mixture of macromolecules of different length and sequence and are analysed via statistical measures (e. g. the degree of polymerization, comonomer composition or dyad and triad fractions).

== NMR-based sequencing ==
Nuclear magnetic resonance (NMR) spectroscopy is known as the most widely applied and “one of the most powerful techniques” for the sequence analysis of synthetic copolymers. NMR spectroscopy allows determination of the relative abundance of comonomer sequences at the level of dyads and in cases of small repeat units even triads or more. It also allows the detection and quantification of chain defects and chain end groups, cyclic oligomers and by-products. However, limitations of NMR spectroscopy are that it cannot, so far, provide information about the sequence distribution along the chain, like gradients, clusters or a long-range order.

=== Example: Copolymer of PET and PEN ===
Monitoring the relative abundance of comonomer sequences is a common technique and is used, for example, to observe the progress of transesterification reactions between polyethylene terephthalate (PET) and polyethylene naphthalate (PEN) in their blends.

During such a transesterification reaction, three resonances representing four diads can be distinguished via ^{1}H NMR spectroscopy by different chemical shifts of the oxyethylene units: The diads -terephthalate-oxyethylene-terephthalate- (TET) and -naphthalate-oxyethylene-naphthalate- (NEN), which are also present in the homopolymers polyethylene naphthalate und polyethylene terephthalate, as well as the (indistinguishable) diads -terephthalate-oxyethylene-naphthalate- (TEN) and -naphthalate-oxyethylene-terephthalate- (NET), which are exclusively present in the copolymer. In the spectrum of a 1:1 physical PET/PEN mixture, only the resonances corresponding to the diads TET and NEN are present at 4.90 and 5.00 ppm, respectively. Once a transesterification reaction occurs, a new resonance at 4.95 ppm emerges that increases in intensity with the reaction time, corresponding to the TEN / NET sequences.

The example of polyethylene naphthalate and polyethylene terephthalate is relatively simple, as only the aromatic part of the polymers differ (naphthalate vs. terephthalate). In a blend of polyethylene naphthalate and polytrimethylene terephthalate, already six resonances can be distinguished, since both, oxyethylene and oxypropylene, form three resonances. The sequence patterns can become even more complex, when triads can be distinguished spectroscopically. The extractable information is limited by the difference in chemical shift and the resonance width. In addition to ^{1}H NMR spectroscopy, also ^{13}C NMR spectroscopy is a common method for the sequencing shown above, which is characterized in particular by a very narrow resonance width.

Deconvolution and assignment of these triad-based resonances allows a quantitative determination of the degree of randomness and the average block length via integration of the distinguishable resonances. In a 1:1 mixture of two linear two-component 1:1 polycondensates (A_{1}B_{1})_{n} and (A_{2}B_{2})_{n} (with molecular weight high enough to neglected chain-ends), the following two equations are valid:

[ A_{i}] = [B_{i}], wherein (i = 1,2) (1)

[ A_{1}B_{2} ] = [ A_{2}B_{1}] (2)

Equation 1 states that the molar ratio of all four repeat units is identical and equation 2 states that both types of copolymer are of identical concentration. In this case, the degree of randomness χ is calculated as given by equation 3:

$\chi = [\frac{A_i B_j}{A_1 A_2 }]$, wherein (i, j = 1, 2) (3)

In the beginning of a transreaction process (e. g. transesterification or transamidation), the degree of randomness χ ≈ 0 as the system comprises a physical mixture of homopolymers or block copolymers. During the transreaction process χ increases up to χ = 1 for a fully random copolymer. If χ > 1 it indicates a tendency of the monomers to form alternating structure, up to χ = 2 for a completely alternating copolymer. The degree of randomness χ gives thereby statistical information about the polymer sequence. The calculation can be modified for three-component and four-component polycondensates.

=== Application ===
NMR spectroscopy is used in industrially relevant systems to study the sequence distribution of copolymers or the occurrence of transesterification in polyester blends. A change in sequence distribution can effect the crystallinity, and transesterification can affect the compatibility of two otherwise incompatible polyesters. Depending on their degree of randomness, copolyesters can show different thermal transitions and behaviours.

== Other sequencing ==
Other options besides traditional NMR spectroscopy for sequence analysis are listed here; these include Kerr-effect for characterization of polymer microstructures, MALDI-TOF mass spectrometry, depolymerization (controlled chemical degradation of macromolecules) via chain-end depolymerization (i.e., unzipping) and nanopore analysis (most of such reported studies, however, have focused on poly(ethylene glycol), PEG).
