= Catalyst transfer polymerization =

Catalyst transfer polymerization (CTP), or catalyst transfer polycondensation, is a type of living chain-growth polymerization that is used for synthesizing conjugated polymers. Benefits to using CTP over other methods are low polydispersity and control over number average molecular weight in the resulting polymers. Very few monomers have been demonstrated to undergo CTP.

== History ==
The first reports of CTP came simultaneously from the labs of Yokozawa and McCullough in 2004, with the recognition that polythiophene can be synthesized with low dispersity and with control over molecular weight. This recognition sparked interest in polymerization mechanism so that it could be expanded to other monomers. Few polymers can be synthesized via CTP, so most conjugated polymers are synthesized via step-growth using palladium catalyzed cross-coupling reactions.

== Characteristics ==
CTP is exclusively performed on arene monomers to give conjugated polymers. The polymers obtained from CTP are often low dispersity due to its living, chain growth nature. Mass spectrometry can be used to identify end-groups on the polymer to determine if the polymer was synthesized via chain growth.

== Types ==
CTP utilizes cross coupling reactions (see Mechanism below) with monomers containing magnesium-, zinc-, boron-, and tin-based transmetallating groups, giving rise to Kumada CTP, Negishi CTP, Suzuki CTP, and Stille CTP reactions.

== Mechanism ==
The mechanism of CTP has been debated. The living chain-growth nature of CTP can be explained by the existence of a π-complex (as described in this section) but can also be explained via polymer reactivity.

=== Initiation ===
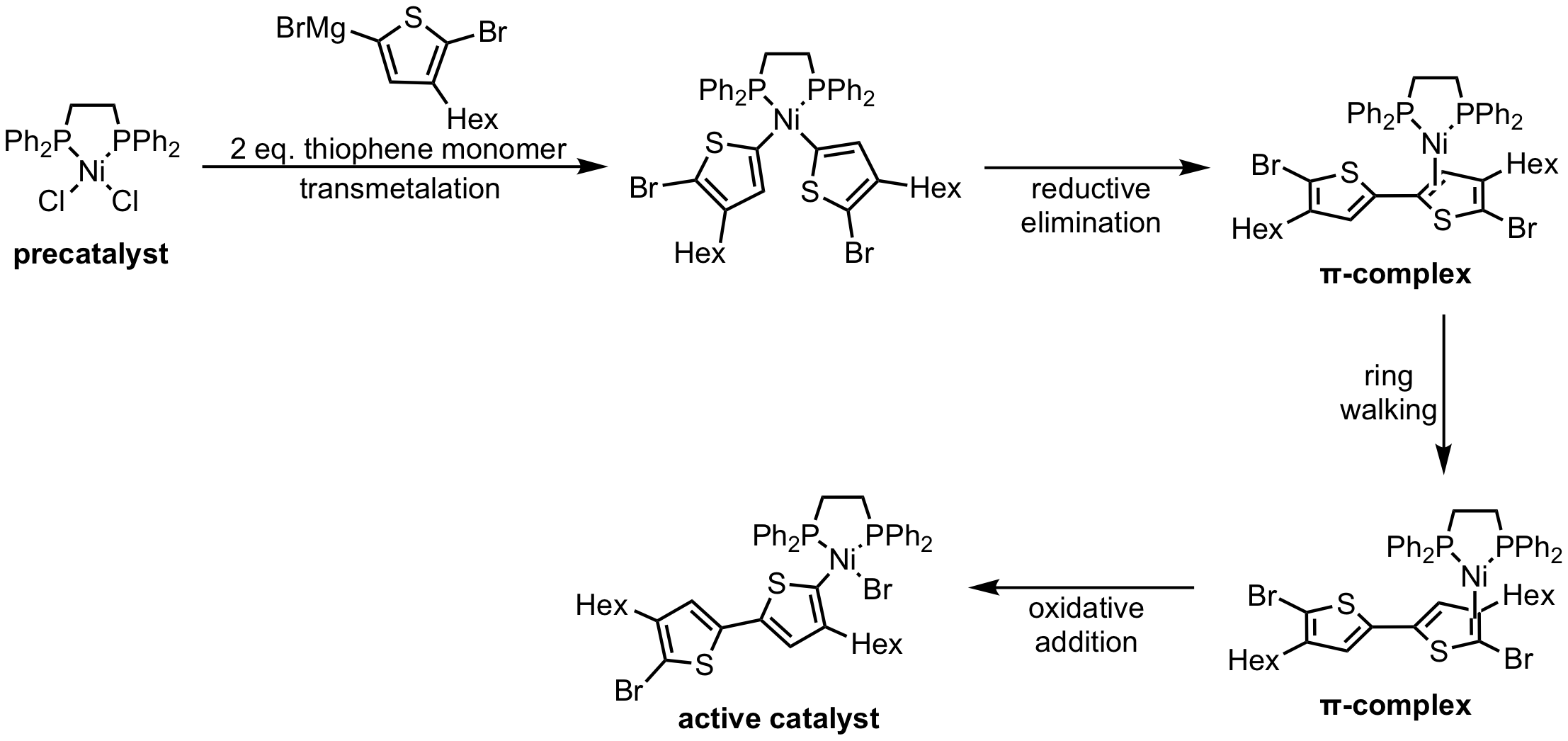

Initiation from a metal(II) species (either Ni or Pd) involves two monomers transmetalating onto the metal center to form a complex that can undergo reductive elimination. The complex formed after reductive elimination is referred to as a π-complex because the catalyst bound to the π system of the monomer. The catalyst can isomerize to other π-complexes via a process known as "ring-walking" to the π-bond adjacent to a C-X bond at the end of the chain allowing oxidative addition to occur. The product of oxidative addition is an active polymer-metal(II)-halide, and it can react with monomers in the propagation reaction.

=== Propagation ===
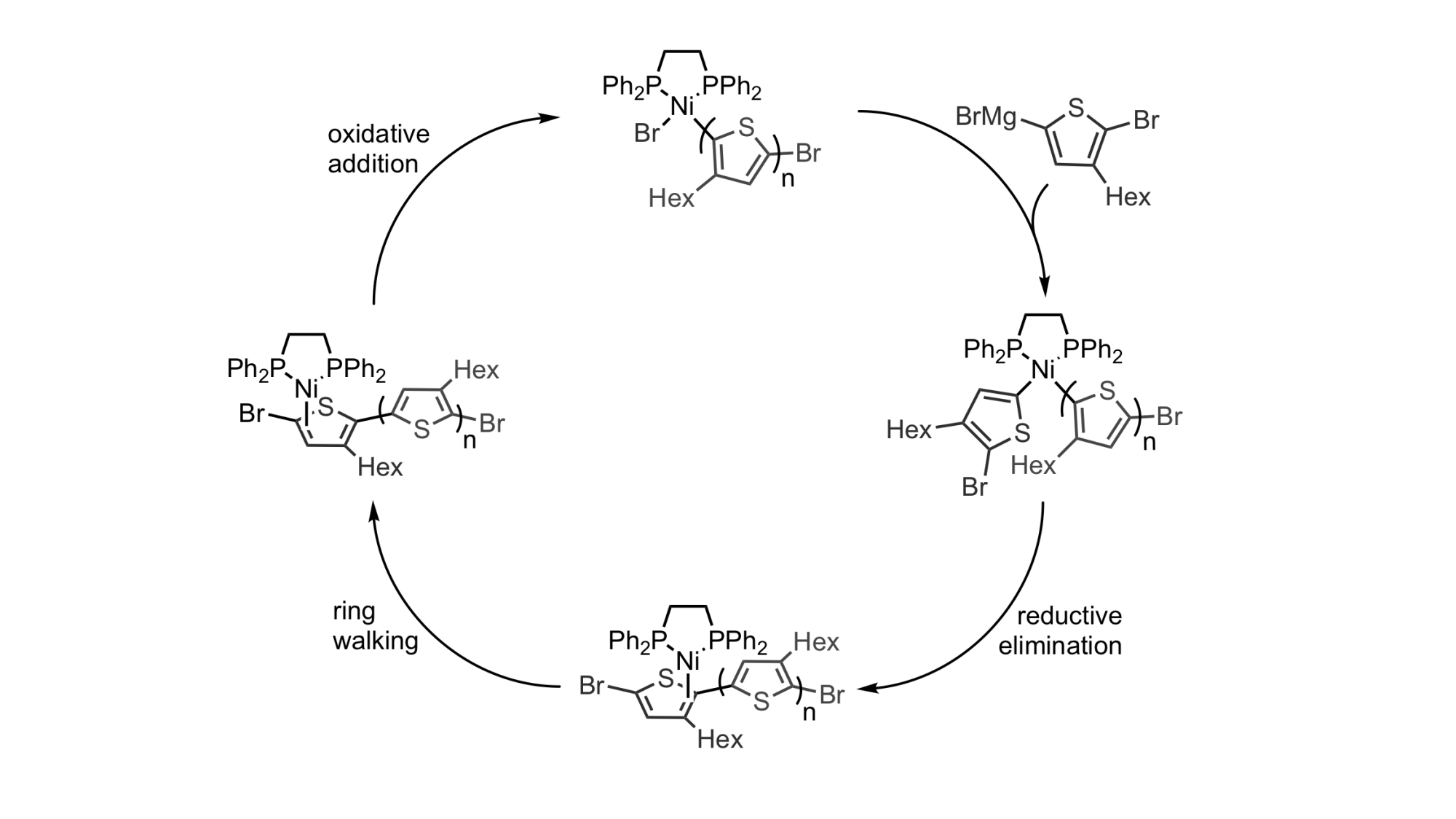
framless

The propagation steps of CTP occurs through a cycle of transmetalation, reductive elimination, ring walking, and oxidative addition. The existence of a π-complex allows for the polymerization to be controlled as it ensures that the catalyst cannot dissociate from the polymer chain (and start new chains). This means that the number of polymer chains at the end of the polymerization should be equal to the number of catalysts in solution, and that the average degree of polymerization of the sample at the end of polymerization should be equal to the ratio of monomers to catalysts in solution.

=== Termination ===
A characteristic of CTP is living chain-growth character, meaning that the catalyst will have a reactive chain end for the entirety of the polymerization. Therefore, to terminate the polymerization, a quenching agent must be added, such as a strong acid to protonate the polymer, or a nucleophile to add an end cap the polymer.

If the π-complex is too weakly bound, termination of polymer chains can occur before a quenching agent is added, causing lower molecular weight polymers to form. Current research into CTP focuses on finding catalysts that form strong catalyst-polymer π-complexes such that the polymerization remains living.

== Analysis ==
Success of CTP is often evaluated using gel permeation chromatography, matrix-assisted laser desorption/ionization, nuclear magnetic resonance spectroscopy. GPC characterization enables determination of average molecular weight. MALDI and NMR allow for identification of end groups of the polymer chain.

== Polymer reactivity versus π-complex ==
The chain growth nature of CTP can also be described without invoking a catalyst-polymer π-complex. If we assume that no π-complex forms and instead every time a monomer was added to a polymer, the polymer becomes more reactive, we would also see chain growth since the largest polymers in the reaction would be the most reactive and would react with monomers preferentially. The presence of this mechanism and one mediated by a π-complex can be elucidated by studying the end groups of the polymers using mass spectrometry.

== Polymers that can be synthesized by CTP ==
A non-exhaustive list of the polymers that can be synthesized using CTP:

- Polythiophene
- Polyphenylene
- Polyselenophene
- Polytellurophene
- Polythiazole
- Polybenzothiadiazole
- Polypyrrole
- Polyfluorene
