= Active center =

The term active center may refer to:

- Active center (polymer science), the site on a chain carrier at which reaction occurs
- The active site of an enzyme
