= Ring-opening polymerization =

Chain polymerization involving cyclic monomers

IUPAC definition

A polymerization in which a cyclic monomer yields a monomeric unit which is acyclic or contains fewer cycles than the monomer. Note: If monomer is polycyclic, the opening of a single ring is sufficient to classify the reaction as ring-opening polymerization.

Modified from the earlier definition.

— Penczek S.; Moad, G. Pure Appl. Chem., 2008, 80(10), 2163-2193

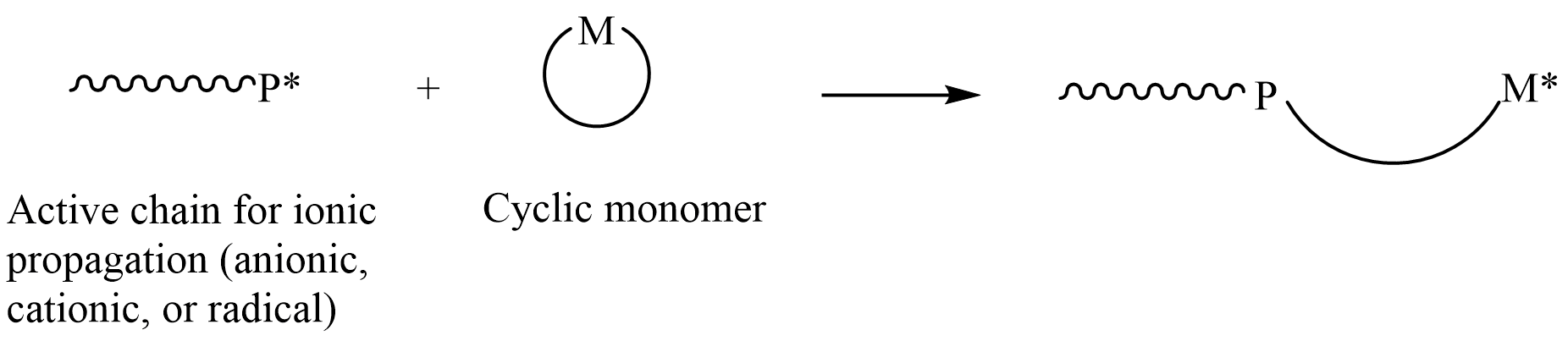
General scheme ionic propagation. Propagating center can be radical, cationic or anionic.

In polymer chemistry, ring-opening polymerization (ROP) is a form of chain-growth polymerization in which the terminus of a polymer chain attacks cyclic monomers to form a longer polymer (see figure). The reactive center can be radical, anionic or cationic.

Ring-opening of cyclic monomers is often driven by the relief of bond-angle strain. Thus, as is the case for other types of polymerization, the enthalpy change in ring-opening is negative. Many rings undergo ROP.

== Monomers ==
Many cyclic monomers are amenable to ROP. These include epoxides, cyclic trisiloxanes, some lactones and lactides, cyclic anhydrides, cyclic carbonates, and amino acid N-carboxyanhydrides. Many strained cycloalkenes, e.g norbornene, are suitable monomers via ring-opening metathesis polymerization. Even highly strained cycloalkane rings, such as cyclopropane and cyclobutane derivatives, can undergo ROP.

== History ==
Ring-opening polymerization has been used since the beginning of the 1900s to produce polymers. Synthesis of polypeptides which has the oldest history of ROP, dates back to the work in 1906 by Leuchs. Subsequently, the ROP of anhydro sugars provided polysaccharides, including synthetic dextran, xanthan gum, welan gum, gellan gum, diutan gum, and pullulan. Mechanisms and thermodynamics of ring-opening polymerization were established in the 1950s. The first high-molecular weight polymers (M_{n} up to 10^{5}) with a repeating unit were prepared by ROP as early as in 1976.

New research shows that ROP can be completed with cyclic esters with minimal to no use of solvents by using resonant acoustic mixing.

An industrial application is the production of nylon-6 from caprolactam.

== Mechanisms ==
Ring-opening polymerization can proceed via radical, anionic, or cationic polymerization as described below. Additionally, radical ROP is useful in producing polymers with functional groups incorporated in the backbone chain that cannot otherwise be synthesized via conventional chain-growth polymerization of vinyl monomers. For instance, radical ROP can produce polymers with ethers, esters, amides, and carbonates as functional groups along the main chain.

=== Anionic ring-opening polymerization (AROP) ===
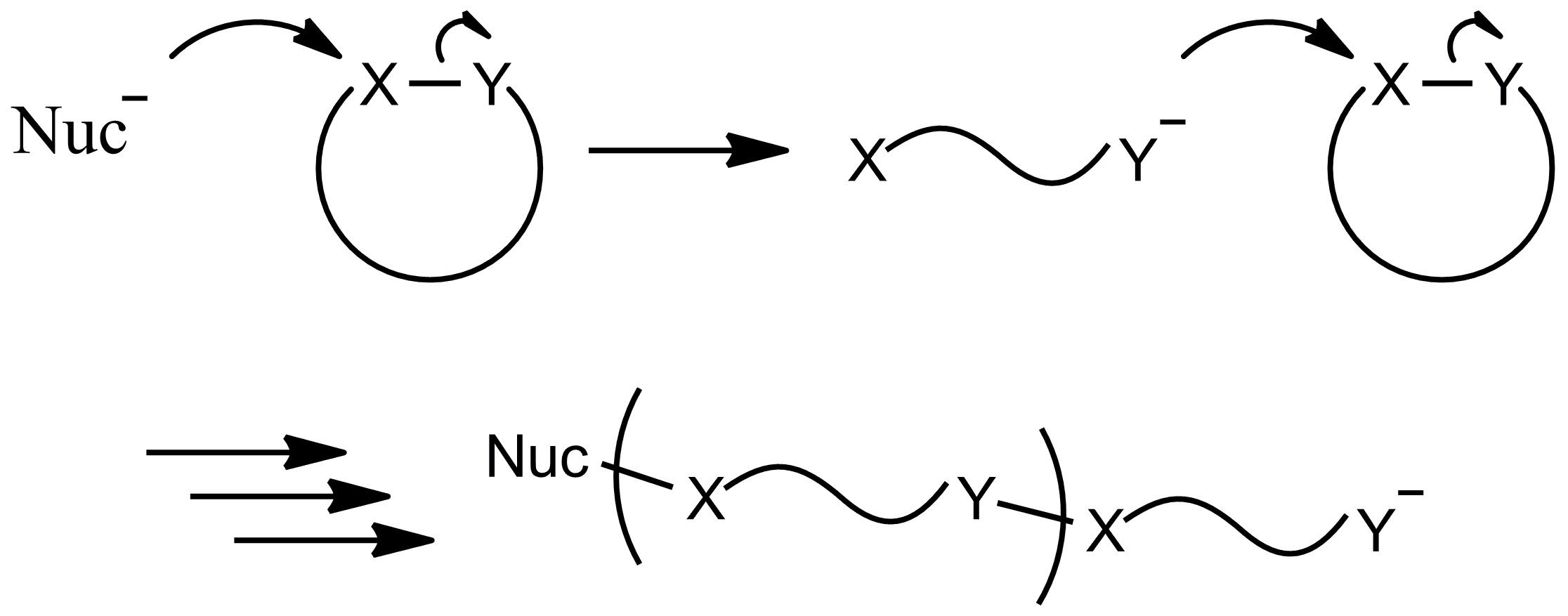
The general mechanism for anionic ring-opening polymerization. Polarized functional group is represented by X-Y, where the atom X (usually a carbon atom) becomes electron deficient due to the highly electron-withdrawing nature of Y (usually an oxygen, nitrogen, sulfur, etc.). The nucleophile will attack atom X, thus releasing Y^{−}. The newly formed nucleophile will then attack the atom X in another monomer molecule, and the sequence would repeat until the polymer is formed.

Anionic ring-opening polymerizations (AROP) involve nucleophilic reagents as initiators. Monomers with a three-member ring structure - such as epoxides, aziridines, and episulfides - undergo anionic ROP.

A typical example of anionic ROP is that of ε-caprolactone, initiated by an alkoxide. Silicones are produced by AROP starting with cyclic siloxanes. A representative reaction is shown with hexamethyltrisiloxane:

n[Si(CH_{3})_{2}O]_{3} → [Si(CH_{3})_{2}O]_{3n}

=== Cationic ring-opening polymerization ===
Cationic initiators and intermediates characterize cationic ring-opening polymerization (CROP). Examples of cyclic monomers that polymerize through this mechanism include lactones, lactams, amines, and ethers. CROP proceeds through an S_{N}1 or S_{N}2 propagation, chain-growth process. The mechanism is affected by the stability of the resulting cationic species. For example, if the atom bearing the positive charge is stabilized by electron-donating groups, polymerization will proceed by the S_{N}1 mechanism. The cationic species is a heteroatom and the chain grows by the addition of cyclic monomers thereby opening the ring system.

Synthesis of Spandex.

The monomers can be activated by Bronsted acids, carbenium ions, onium ions, and metal cations.

CROP can be a living polymerization and can be terminated by nucleophilic reagents such as phenoxy anions, phosphines, or polyanions. When the amount of monomers becomes depleted, termination can occur intra or intermolecularly. The active end can "backbite" the chain, forming a macrocycle. Alkyl chain transfer is also possible, where the active end is quenched by transferring an alkyl chain to another polymer.

=== Ring-opening metathesis polymerization ===
Ring-opening metathesis polymerisation (ROMP) produces unsaturated polymers from cycloalkenes or bicycloalkenes. It requires organometallic catalysts.

The mechanism for ROMP follows similar pathways as olefin metathesis. The initiation process involves the coordination of the cycloalkene monomer to the metal alkylidene complex, followed by a [2+2] type cycloaddition to form the metallacyclobutane intermediate that cycloreverts to form a new alkylidene species.

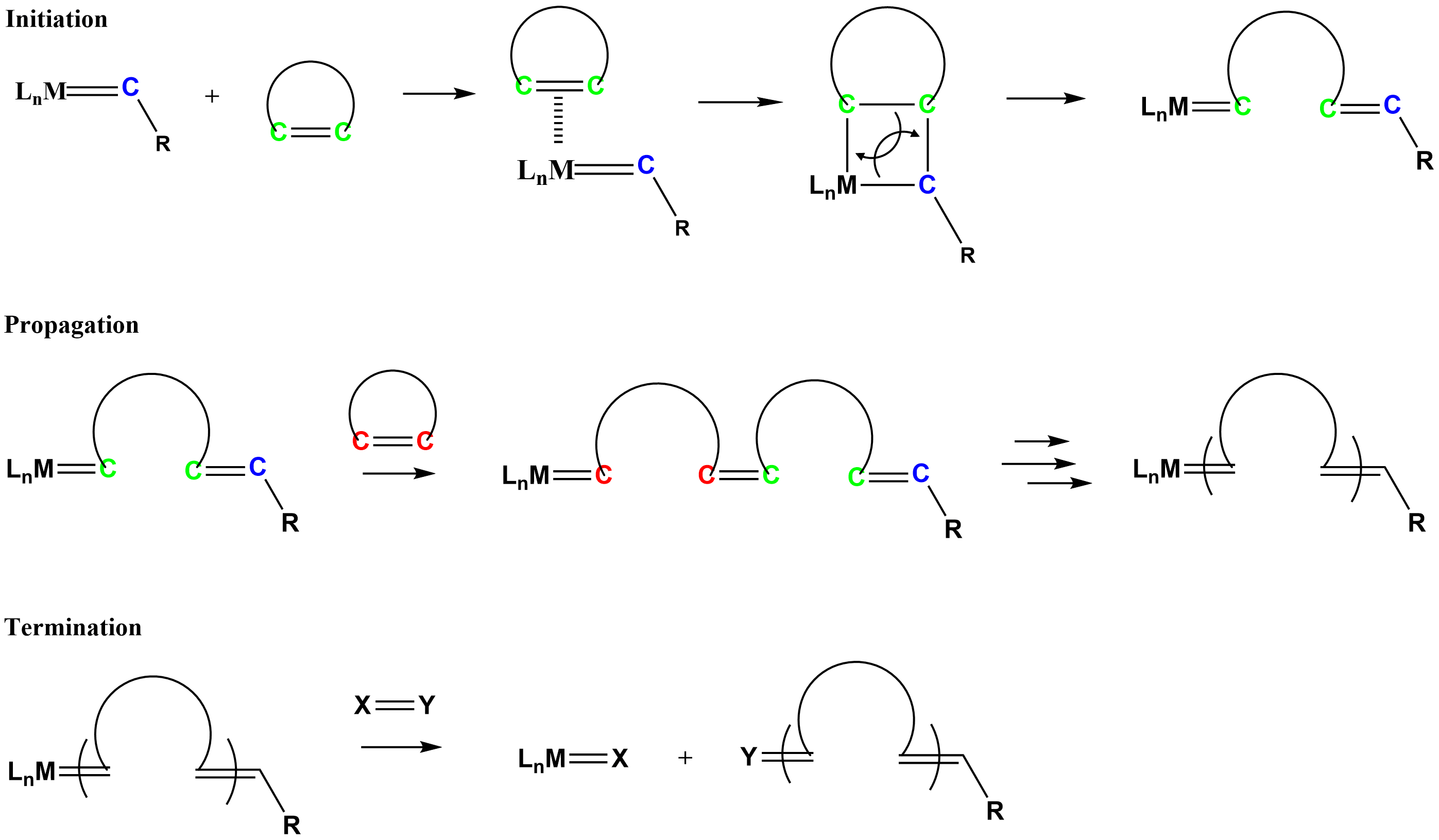
General scheme of the mechanism for ROMP.

Commercially relevant unsaturated polymers synthesized by ROMP include polynorbornene, polycyclooctene, and polycyclopentadiene.

== Thermodynamics ==
The formal thermodynamic criterion of a given monomer polymerizability is related to a sign of the free enthalpy (Gibbs free energy) of polymerization:
$$\Delta G_p(xy) = \Delta H_p(xy)-T\Delta S_p(xy)$$
where:

x and y indicate monomer and polymer states, respectively (x and/or y = l (liquid), g (gaseous), c (amorphous solid), c' (crystalline solid), s (solution));
ΔH_{p}(xy) is the enthalpy of polymerization (SI unit: joule per kelvin);
ΔS_{p}(xy) is the entropy of polymerization (SI unit: joule);
T is the absolute temperature (SI unit: kelvin).

The free enthalpy of polymerization (ΔG_{p}) may be expressed as a sum of standard enthalpy of polymerization (ΔG_{p}°) and a term related to instantaneous monomer molecules and growing macromolecules concentrations:
$$\Delta G_p = \Delta G^\circ_p + RT\ln\frac{[\ldots - (\ce{m})_{i+1} \ce{m}^\ast]}{[\ce{M}][\ldots-(\ce{m})_i \ce{m}^\ast]}$$
where:

R is the gas constant;
M is the monomer;
(m)_{i} is the monomer in an initial state;
m^{*} is the active monomer.

Following Flory–Huggins solution theory that the reactivity of an active center, located at a macromolecule of a sufficiently long macromolecular chain, does not depend on its degree of polymerization (DP_{i}), and taking in to account that ΔG_{p}° = ΔH_{p}° − TΔS_{p}° (where ΔH_{p}° and ΔS_{p}° indicate a standard polymerization enthalpy and entropy, respectively), we obtain:

$$\Delta G_p = \Delta H^\circ_p - T(\Delta S^\circ_p + R\ln[M])$$

At equilibrium (ΔG_{p} = 0), when polymerization is complete the monomer concentration ([M]_{eq}) assumes a value determined by standard polymerization parameters (ΔH_{p}° and ΔS_{p}°) and polymerization temperature:
$$\begin{align}
{}[\ce{M}]_{\rm eq} &= \exp\left(\frac{\Delta H^\circ_p}{RT} - \frac{\Delta S^\circ_p}{R}\right) \\[4pt]
\ln\frac{DP_n}{DP_n - 1}[\ce{M}]_{\rm eq} &= \frac{\Delta H^\circ_p}{RT} - \frac{\Delta S^\circ_p}{R} \\[4pt]
[\ce{M}]_{\rm eq} &= \frac{DP_n - 1}{DP_n} \exp\left(\frac{\Delta H^\circ_p}{RT} - \frac{\Delta S^\circ_p}{R}\right)
\end{align}$$
Polymerization is possible only when [M]_{0} > [M]_{eq}. Eventually, at or above the so-called ceiling temperature (T_{c}), at which [M]_{eq} = [M]_{0}, formation of the high polymer does not occur.
$$\begin{align}
T_c &= \frac{\Delta H^\circ_p}{\Delta S^\circ_p + R\ln[\ce{M}]_0} ; \quad (\Delta H^\circ_p<0,\ \Delta S^\circ_p<0) \\[4pt]
T_f &= \frac{\Delta H^\circ_p}{\Delta S^\circ_p + R\ln[\ce{M}]_0} ; \quad (\Delta H^\circ_p>0,\ \Delta S^\circ_p>0)
\end{align}$$
For example, tetrahydrofuran (THF) cannot be polymerized above T_{c} = 84 °C, nor cyclo-octasulfur (S_{8}) below T_{f} = 159 °C. However, for many monomers, T_{c} and T_{f}, for polymerization in the bulk, are well above or below the operable polymerization temperatures, respectively. The polymerization of a majority of monomers is accompanied by an entropy decrease, due mostly to the loss in the translational degrees of freedom. In this situation, polymerization is thermodynamically allowed only when the enthalpic contribution into ΔG_{p} prevails (thus, when ΔH_{p}° < 0 and ΔS_{p}° < 0, the inequality |ΔH_{p}| > −TΔS_{p} is required). Therefore, the higher the ring strain, the lower the resulting monomer concentration at equilibrium.

== Additional reading ==
- Luck, Russel M.; Sadhir, Rajender K., eds. (1992). Expanding Monomers: Synthesis, Characterization, and Applications. Boca Raton, Florida: CRC Press. ISBN 978-0-8493-5156-3.
- Nahrain E. Kamber; Wonhee Jeong; Robert M. Waymouth; Russell C. Pratt; Bas G. G. Lohmeijer; James L. Hedrick (2007). "Organocatalytic Ring-Opening Polymerization". Chemical Reviews. 107 (12): 5813–5840. doi:10.1021/cr068415b. PMID 17988157.
- Dubois, Philippe; Coulembier, Olivier; Raquez, Jean-Marie, eds. (2009). Handbook of Ring-Opening Polymerization. Wiley. doi:10.1002/9783527628407. ISBN 9783527628407.
