= Anhydroglucose unit =

The anhydroglucose unit (AGU) refers to a single sugar molecule in a polymer. Each AGU is reduced to its functional groups, 3 hydroxyl groups per AGU.

Carbohydrate AGU:

Polymer	AGU	mmol -OH/g
Amylose	200-2000	

Cellulose AGU:

Polymer	AGU	mmol -OH/g
cotton fibers	4,000-7,000	
cotton linters	500-3,250	
baggase	350-450	
wood fibers	4,000-4,500	

== See also ==
- Degree of polymerization
