= Chain propagation =

Propagation of a chemical chain reaction by continuously regenerating a reactive species

IUPAC definition

(in a chain polymerization) Chemical reaction between a chain carrier and a monomer that results in the growth of a polymer chain and the regeneration of at least one chain carrier.

Note 1: The recommended symbol for the rate constant for chain propagation in a homopolymerization is k_{p}.

— Penczek S.; Moad, G. Pure Appl. Chem., 2008, 80(10), 2163-2193

In chemistry, chain propagation (sometimes just referred to as propagation) is a process in which a reactive intermediate is continuously regenerated during the course of a chemical chain reaction. For example, in the chlorination of methane, there is a two-step propagation cycle in which the chain carriers are a chlorine atom and a methyl radical which are regenerated alternately:

·Cl + CH_{4} → HCl + ·CH_{3}
·CH_{3} + Cl_{2} → CH_{3}Cl + ·Cl

The two steps add to give the equation for the overall chain reaction:

CH_{4} + Cl_{2} → CH_{3}Cl + HCl

== Polymerization ==
In a chain-growth polymerization reaction, the reactive end-groups of a polymer chain react in each propagation step with a new monomer molecule transferring the reactive group to the last unit. Here the chain carrier is the polymer molecule with a reactive end-group, and at each step it is regenerated with the addition of one monomer unit M:
$$\bigl[ \ce{-M -}  \bigr]_n + \ce{M} \rightarrow \bigl[ \ce{-M -} \bigr]_{n+1}$$
