= Chain-growth polymerization =

Polymerization mechanism

Chain-growth polymerization (AE) or chain-growth polymerisation (BE) is a polymerization technique where monomer molecules add onto the active site on a growing polymer chain one at a time. There are a limited number of these active sites at any moment during the polymerization which gives this method its key characteristics.

Chain-growth polymerization involves 4 types of reactions :

1. Initiation: An active species I* is formed by some decomposition of an initiator molecule I
2. Propagation: The initiator fragment reacts with a monomer M to begin the conversion to the polymer; the center of activity is retained in the adduct. Monomers continue to add in the same way until polymers P_{i}* are formed with the degree of polymerization i
3. Termination: By some reaction generally involving two polymers containing active centers, the growth center is deactivated, resulting in dead polymer
4. Chain transfer: The active species is transferred to another molecule, e.g. solvent, polymeric chain, monomer, etc via transfer of a group or an atom (e.g. Hydrogen atom). Chain transfer may or may not occur depending on the nature of the reactive species.

== Introduction ==
IUPAC definition

chain polymerization: A chain reaction in which the growth of a polymer chain proceeds exclusively by reaction(s) between monomer and reactive site(s) on the polymer chain with regeneration of the reactive site(s) at the end of each growth step. (See Gold Book entry for note.)

An example of chain-growth polymerization by ring opening to polycaprolactone

In 1953, Paul Flory first classified polymerization as "step-growth polymerization" and "chain-growth polymerization". IUPAC recommends to further simplify "chain-growth polymerization" to "chain polymerization". It is a kind of polymerization where an active center (free radical or ion) is formed, and a plurality of monomers can be polymerized together in a short period of time to form a macromolecule having a large molecular weight. In addition to the regenerated active sites of each monomer unit, polymer growth will only occur at one (or possibly more) endpoint.

Many common polymers can be obtained by chain polymerization such as polyethylene (PE), polypropylene (PP), polyvinyl chloride (PVC), poly(methyl methacrylate) (PMMA), polyacrylonitrile (PAN), polyvinyl acetate (PVA).

Typically, chain-growth polymerization can be understood with the chemical equation:

$$P_x^* + M  \rightarrow P_{x+1}^* + L (x=1,2,3...)$$

In this equation, P is the polymer while x represents degree of polymerization, * means active center of chain-growth polymerization, M is the monomer which will react with active center, and L may be a low-molar-mass by-product obtained during chain propagation. For most chain-growth polymerizations, there is no by-product L formed. However there are some exceptions, such as the polymerization of amino acid N-carboxyanhydrides to oxazolidine-2,5-diones.

This type of polymerization is described as "chain" or "chain-growth" because the reaction mechanism is a chemical chain reaction with an initiation step in which an active center is formed, followed by a rapid sequence of chain propagation steps in which the polymer molecule grows by addition of one monomer molecule to the active center in each step. The word "chain" here does not refer to the fact that polymer molecules form long chains. Some polymers are formed instead by a second type of mechanism known as step-growth polymerization without rapid chain propagation steps.

== Reaction steps ==
All chain-growth polymerization reactions must include chain initiation and chain propagation. Chain transfer and chain termination steps also occur in many but not all chain-growth polymerizations.

=== Chain initiation ===
Chain initiation is the initial generation of a chain carrier, which is an intermediate such as a radical or an ion which can continue the reaction by chain propagation. Initiation steps are classified according to the way that energy is provided: thermal initiation, high energy initiation, and chemical initiation, etc. Thermal initiation uses molecular thermal motion to dissociate a molecule and form active centers. High energy initiation refers to the generation of chain carriers by radiation. Chemical initiation is due to a chemical initiator.

For the case of radical polymerization as an example, chain initiation involves the dissociation of a radical initiator molecule (I) which is easily dissociated by heat or light into two free radicals (2 R°). Each radical R° then adds a first monomer molecule (M) to start a chain which terminates with a monomer activated by the presence of an unpaired electron (RM_{1}°).

- I → 2 R°
- R° + M → RM_{1}°

=== Chain propagation ===
IUPAC defines chain propagation as a reaction of an active center on the growing polymer molecule, which adds one monomer molecule to form a new polymer molecule (RM_{1}°) one repeat unit longer.

For radical polymerization, the active center remains an atom with an unpaired electron. The addition of the second monomer and a typical later addition step are

- RM_{1}° + M → RM_{2}°
- ...............
- RM_{n}° + M → RM_{n+1}°

For some polymers, chains of over 1000 monomer units can be formed in milliseconds.

=== Chain termination ===
In a chain termination step, the active center disappears, resulting in the termination of chain propagation. This is different from chain transfer in which the active center only shifts to another molecule but does not disappear.

For radical polymerization, termination involves a reaction of two growing polymer chains to eliminate the unpaired electrons of both chains. There are two possibilities.

1. Recombination is the reaction of the unpaired electrons of two chains to form a covalent bond between them. The product is a single polymer molecule with the combined length of the two reactant chains:

- RM_{n}° + RM_{m}° → P_{n+m}

2. Disproportionation is the transfer of a hydrogen atom from one chain to the other, so that the two product chain molecules are unchanged in length but are no longer free radicals:

- RM_{n}° + RM_{m}° → P_{n} + P_{m}

Initiation, propagation and termination steps also occur in chain reactions of smaller molecules. This is not true of the chain transfer and branching steps considered next.

=== Chain transfer ===
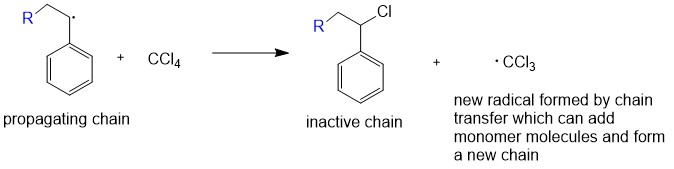
An example of chain transfer in styrene polymerization. Here X = Cl and Y = CCl_{3}.

In some chain-growth polymerizations there is also a chain transfer step, in which the growing polymer chain RM_{n}° takes an atom X from an inactive molecule XY, terminating the growth of the polymer chain: RM_{n}° + XY → RM_{n}X + Y°. The Y fragment ls a new active center which adds more monomer M to form a new growing chain YM_{n}°. This can happen in free radical polymerization for chains RM_{n}°, in ionic polymerization for chains RM_{n}^{+} or RM_{n}^{–}, or in coordination polymerization. In most cases chain transfer will generate a by-product and decrease the molar mass of the final polymer.

=== Chain transfer to polymer: Branching ===
Another possibility is chain transfer to a second polymer molecule, result in the formation of a product macromolecule with a branched structure. In this case the growing chain takes an atom X from a second polymer chain whose growth had been completed. The growth of the first polymer chain is completed by the transfer of atom X. However the second molecule loses an atom X from the interior of its polymer chain to form a reactive radical (or ion) which can add more monomer molecules. This results in the addition of a branch or side chain and the formation of a product macromolecule with a branched structure.

== Classes of chain-growth polymerization ==
The International Union of Pure and Applied Chemistry (IUPAC) recommends definitions for several classes of chain-growth polymerization.

=== Radical polymerization ===
Based on the IUPAC definition, radical polymerization is a chain polymerization in which the kinetic-chain carriers are radicals. Usually, the growing chain end bears an unpaired electron. Free radicals can be initiated by many methods such as heating, redox reactions, ultraviolet radiation, high energy irradiation, electrolysis, sonication, and plasma. Free radical polymerization is very important in polymer chemistry. It is one of the most developed methods in chain-growth polymerization. Currently, most polymers in our daily life are synthesized by free radical polymerization, including polyethylene, polystyrene, polyvinyl chloride, polymethyl methacrylate, polyacrylonitrile, polyvinyl acetate, styrene butadiene rubber, nitrile rubber, neoprene, etc.

=== Ionic polymerization ===
Ionic polymerization is a chain polymerization in which the kinetic-chain carriers are ions or ion pairs. It can be further divided into anionic polymerization and cationic polymerization. Ionic polymerization generates many polymers used in daily life, such as butyl rubber, polyisobutylene, polyphenylene, polyoxymethylene, polysiloxane, polyethylene oxide, high density polyethylene, isotactic polypropylene, butadiene rubber, etc. Living anionic polymerization was developed in the 1950s. The chain will remain active indefinitely unless the reaction is transferred or terminated deliberately, which allows the control of molar weight and dispersity (or polydispersity index, PDI).

=== Coordination polymerization ===
Coordination polymerization is a chain polymerization that involves the preliminary coordination of a monomer molecule with a chain carrier. The monomer is first coordinated with the transition metal active center, and then the activated monomer is inserted into the transition metal-carbon bond for chain growth. In some cases, coordination polymerization is also called insertion polymerization or complexing polymerization. Advanced coordination polymerizations can control the tacticity, molecular weight and PDI of the polymer effectively. In addition, the racemic mixture of the chiral metallocene can be separated into its enantiomers. The oligomerization reaction produces an optically active branched olefin using an optically active catalyst.

=== Living polymerization ===
Living polymerization was first described by Michael Szwarc in 1956. It is defined as a chain polymerization from which chain transfer and chain termination are absent. In the absence of chain-transfer and chain termination, the monomer in the system is consumed and the polymerization stops but the polymer chain remains active. If new monomer is added, the polymerization can proceed.

Due to the low PDI and predictable molecular weight, living polymerization is at the forefront of polymer research. It can be further divided into living free radical polymerization, living ionic polymerization and living ring-opening metathesis polymerization, etc.

=== Ring-opening polymerization ===
Ring-opening polymerization is defined as a polymerization in which a cyclic monomer yields a monomeric unit which is acyclic or contains fewer cycles than the monomer. Generally, the ring-opening polymerization is carried out under mild conditions, and the by-product is less than in the polycondensation reaction. A high molecular weight polymer is easily obtained. Common ring-opening polymerization products includes polypropylene oxide, polytetrahydrofuran, polyepichlorohydrin, polyoxymethylene, polycaprolactam and polysiloxane.

=== Reversible-deactivation polymerization ===
Reversible-deactivation polymerization is defined as a chain polymerization propagated by chain carriers that are deactivated reversibly, bringing them into one or more active-dormant equilibria. An example of a reversible-deactivation polymerization is group-transfer polymerization.

== Comparison with step-growth polymerization ==
Polymers were first classified according to polymerization method by Wallace Carothers in 1929, who introduced the terms addition polymer and condensation polymer to describe polymers made by addition reactions and condensation reactions respectively. However this classification is inadequate to describe a polymer which can be made by either type of reaction, for example nylon 6 which can be made either by addition of a cyclic monomer or by condensation of a linear monomer.

Flory revised the classification to chain-growth polymerization and step-growth polymerization, based on polymerization mechanisms rather than polymer structures. IUPAC now recommends that the names of step-growth polymerization and chain-growth polymerization be further simplified to polycondensation (or polyaddition if no low-molar-mass by-product is formed when a monomer is added) and chain polymerization.

Most polymerizations are either chain-growth or step-growth reactions. Chain-growth includes both initiation and propagation steps (at least), and the propagation of chain-growth polymers proceeds by the addition of monomers to a growing polymer with an active centre. In contrast step-growth polymerization involves only one type of step, and macromolecules can grow by reaction steps between any two molecular species: two monomers, a monomer and a growing chain, or two growing chains. In step growth, the monomers will initially form dimers, trimers, etc. which later react to form long chain polymers.

In chain-growth polymerization, a growing macromolecule increases in size rapidly once its growth is initiated. When a macromolecule stops growing it generally will add no more monomers. In step-growth polymerization on the other hand, a single polymer molecule can grow over the course of the whole reaction.

In chain-growth polymerization, long macromolecules with high molecular weight are formed when only a small fraction of monomer has reacted. Monomers are consumed steadily over the course of the whole reaction, but the degree of polymerization can increase very quickly after chain initiation. However in step-growth polymerization the monomer is consumed very quickly to dimer, trimer and oligomer. The degree of polymerization increases steadily during the whole polymerization process.

The type of polymerization of a given monomer usually depends on the functional groups present, and sometimes also on whether the monomer is linear or cyclic. Chain-growth polymers are usually addition polymers by Carothers' definition. They are typically formed by addition reactions of C=C bonds in the monomer backbone, which contains only carbon-carbon bonds. Another possibility is ring-opening polymerization, as for the chain-growth polymerization of tetrahydrofuran or of polycaprolactone (see Introduction above).

Step-growth polymers are typically condensation polymers in which an elimination product as such as H_{2}O are formed. Examples are polyamides, polycarbonates, polyesters, polyimides, polysiloxanes and polysulfones. If no elimination product is formed, then the polymer is an addition polymer, such as a polyurethane or a poly(phenylene oxide). Chain-growth polymerization with a low-molar-mass by-product during chain growth is described by IUPAC as "condensative chain polymerization".

Compared to step-growth polymerization, living chain-growth polymerization shows low molar mass dispersity (or PDI), predictable molar mass distribution and controllable conformation. Generally, polycondensation proceeds in a step-growth polymerization mode.

== Application ==
Chain polymerization products are widely used in many aspects of life, including electronic devices, food packaging, catalyst carriers, medical materials, etc. At present, the world's highest yielding polymers such as polyethylene (PE), polyvinyl chloride (PVC), polypropylene (PP), etc. can be obtained by chain polymerization. In addition, some carbon nanotube polymer is used for electronical devices. Controlled living chain-growth conjugated polymerization will also enable the synthesis of well-defined advanced structures, including block copolymers. Their industrial applications extend to water purification, biomedical devices and sensors.
