= Chain transfer =

Movement of the active site on one growing polymer chain to another molecule

In polymer chemistry, a chain transfer reaction is an event during a polymerization reaction by which the activity of a growing polymer chain is transferred to another molecule:

$$\ce{P}^\bullet + \ce{XR -> PX + R}^\bullet$$
where • is the active center, P is the initial polymer chain, X is the end group, and R is the substituent to which the active center is transferred.

Chain transfer reactions reduce the average molecular weight of the final polymer. Chain transfer can be either introduced deliberately into a polymerization (by use of a chain transfer agent) or it may be an unavoidable side-reaction with various components of the polymerization. Chain transfer reactions occur in most forms of addition polymerization including radical polymerization, ring-opening polymerization, coordination polymerization, and cationic polymerization, as well as anionic polymerization.

IUPAC definitions

Chain transfer (in a chain polymerization): Chemical reaction occurring during a chain polymerization in which an active center is transferred from a growing macromolecule or oligomer molecule to another molecule or to another site on the same molecule.

Chain-transfer agent: Substance able to react with a chain carrier by a reaction in which the original chain carrier is deactivated and a new chain carrier is generated.

== Types ==
Chain transfer reactions are usually categorized by the nature of the molecule that reacts with the growing chain.

- Transfer to chain transfer agent. Chain transfer agents have at least one weak chemical bond, which therefore facilitates the chain transfer reaction. Common chain transfer agents include thiols, especially dodecyl mercaptan (DDM), and halocarbons such as carbon tetrachloride. Chain transfer agents are sometimes called modifiers or regulators.
- Transfer to monomer. Chain transfer to monomer may take place in which the growing polymer chain abstracts an atom from unreacted monomer existing in the reaction medium. Because, by definition, polymerization reactions only take place in the presence of monomer, chain transfer to monomer determines the theoretical maximum molecular weight that can be achieved by a given monomer. Chain transfer to monomer is especially significant in cationic addition polymerization and ring-opening polymerization.
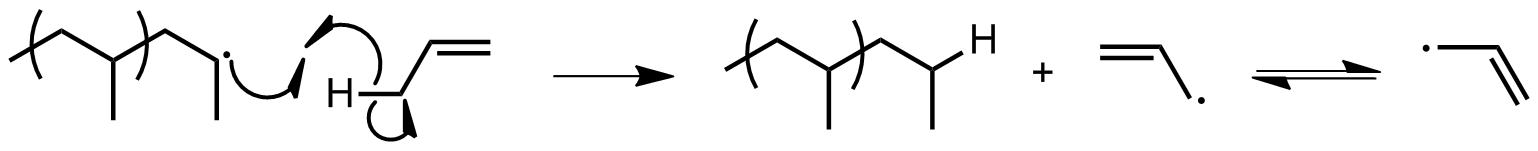
  Chain transfer from polypropylene to monomer.
- Transfer to polymer. Chain transfer may take place with an already existing polymer chain, especially under conditions in which much polymer is present. This often occurs at the end of a radical polymerization when almost all monomer has been consumed. Branched polymers are formed as monomer adds to the new radical site which is located along the polymer backbone. The properties of low-density polyethylene are critically determined by the amount of chain transfer to polymer that takes place.
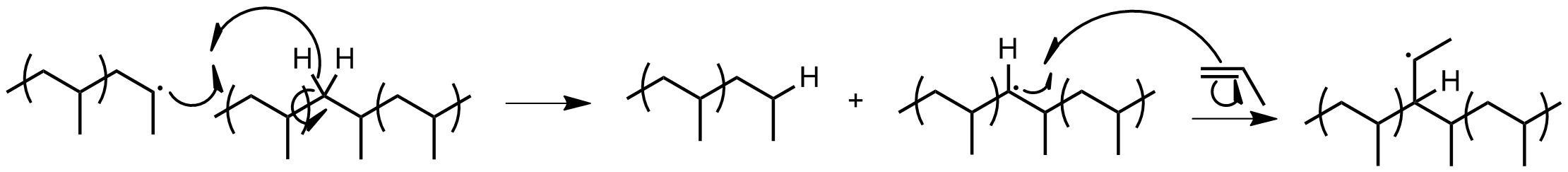
  Chain transfer from polypropylene to backbone of another polypropylene.
- Transfer to solvent. In solution polymerization, the solvent can act as a chain transfer agent. Unless the solvent is chosen to be inert, very low molecular weight polymers (oligomers) can result.
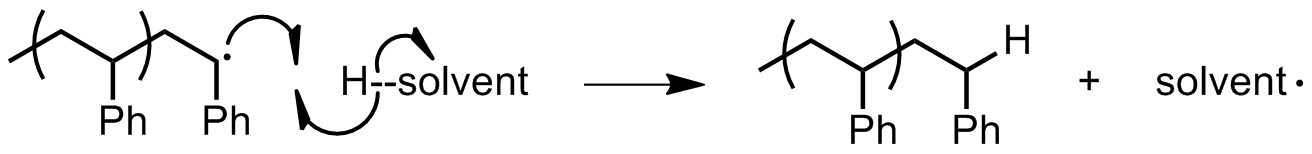
  Chain transfer from polystyrene to solvent.

== Historical development ==
Chain transfer was first proposed by Hugh Stott Taylor and William H. Jones in 1930. They were studying the production of polyethylene [(C_{2}H_{4})_{n}] from ethylene [C_{2}H_{4}] and hydrogen [H_{2}] in the presence of ethyl radicals that had been generated by the thermal decomposition of (Et)_{2}Hg and (Et)_{4}Pb. The observed product mixture could be best explained by postulating "transfer" of radical character from one reactant to another.

Flory incorporated the radical transfer concept in his mathematical treatment of vinyl polymerization in 1937. He coined the term "chain transfer" to explain observations that, during polymerization, average polymer chain lengths were usually lower than predicted by rate considerations alone.

The first widespread use of chain transfer agents came during World War II in the US Rubber Reserve Company. The "Mutual" recipe for styrene-butadiene rubber was based on the Buna-S recipe, developed by I. G. Farben in the 1930s. The Buna-S recipe, however, produced a very tough, high molecular weight rubber that required heat processing to break it down and make it processable on standard rubber mills. Researchers at Standard Oil Development Company and the U. S. Rubber Company discovered that addition of a mercaptan modifier to the recipe not only produced a lower molecular weight and more tractable rubber, but it also increased the polymerization rate. Use of a mercaptan modifier became standard in the Mutual recipe.

Although German scientists had become familiar with the actions of chain transfer agents in the 1930s, Germany continued to make unmodified rubber to the end of the war and did not fully exploit their knowledge.

Throughout the 1940s and 1950s, progress was made in the understanding of the chain transfer reaction and the behavior of chain transfer agents. Snyder et al. proved the sulfur from a mercaptan modifier did indeed become incorporated into a polymer chain under the conditions of bulk or emulsion polymerization. A series of papers from Frank R. Mayo (at the U.S. Rubber Co.) laid the foundation for determining the rates of chain transfer reactions.

In the early 1950s, workers at DuPont conclusively demonstrated that short and long branching in polyethylene was due to two different mechanisms of chain transfer to polymer. Around the same time, the presence of chain transfer in cationic polymerizations was firmly established.

== Current activity ==
The nature of chain transfer reactions is currently well understood and is given in standard polymerization textbooks. Since the 1980s, however, a particularly active area of research has been in the various forms of free radical living polymerizations including catalytic chain transfer polymerization, Reversible Addition-Fragmentation chain Transfer (RAFT) polymerization, and iodine transfer polymerization (ITP). In these processes, the chain transfer reaction produces a polymer chain with similar chain transfer activity to the original chain transfer agent. Therefore, there is no net loss of chain transfer activity.
