= Active center (polymer science) =

Kinetic-chain carrier

IUPAC definition

The site on a chain carrier at which reaction occurs.

Note: In the Gold Book, the terms “active center” and “active site”

are defined with reference to heterogeneous catalysis and the term

“reactive site” is used within the definition of chain polymerization.

— Jenkins, A. D..; Jones, R. G.; Moad, G. Pure Appl. Chem., 2010, 82(2), 483-491

An active center (sometimes called active site or kinetic-chain carrier) in polymer science refers to the site on a chain carrier at which reaction occurs.
