= Chain termination =

Ability of some chain polymerization reactions to halt themselves

In polymer chemistry, chain termination is any chemical reaction that ceases the formation of reactive intermediates in a chain propagation step in the course of a polymerization, effectively bringing it to a halt. Chain termination contributes to chain length, end-group structure, and other properties such as thermal stability and toughness.

There are multiple types of chain termination depending on the type of polymerization that is being used. Free radical, cationic, and anionic polymerizations are among the most common types of addition polymerizations and all employ different mechanisms for termination of chain growth. In free radical polymerizations, recombination and disproportionation are two termination mechanisms that are commonly observed. In recombination, two free radical ends combine to form a covalent bond, while in disproportionation, a hydrogen atom is transferred between two radical ends to form two molecules. In cationic polymerization, termination can occur via halide addition, β-elimination, or chain transfer. There are no such termination mechanisms for anionic polymerization. Instead, termination is commonly induced by the presence of trace impurities such as oxygen gas, carbon dioxide, or water molecules. Because the anionic chain ends are stable, they continue to grow in a process known as 'living' polymerization, and growth is halted once the monomer is depleted.

IUPAC definition

Chemical reaction in which a chain carrier is converted irreversibly into
a non-propagating species without the formation of a new chain carrier.

== Mechanisms of termination ==
In polymer chemistry, there are several mechanisms by which a polymerization reaction can terminate depending on the mechanism and circumstances of the reaction. A method of termination that applies to all polymer reactions is the depletion of monomer. In chain growth polymerization, two growing chains can collide head to head causing the growth of both of the chains to stop. In the case of cationic polymerization, chain transfer can occur where the radical at the end of the growing chain can be transferred from the chain to an individual monomer unit causing a new chain to start growing and the previous chain to stop growing. With step-growth polymerization, the reaction can be terminated by adding a monofunctional species containing the same functionality as one or more of the types of monomer used in the reaction. For example, an alcohol R'−OH can be used to stop a reaction between a polyisocyanate and a polyol because it will react with the isocyanate functionality R−N=C=O to produce R−(N−H)−(C=O)−O−R' which is then no longer reactive with the polyol.

== Termination of radical polymerization ==
The termination steps of free radical polymerization steps are of two types: recombination and disproportionation. Each termination type is dependent on the nature of the polymerizable monomer. For instance, acrylonitrile and styrene typically undergo termination by recombination, while methyl methacrylate and vinyl acetate undergo termination by disproportionation. The viscosity of the reaction medium can also influence the selectivity for the recombination and disproportionation termination types. When viscosity increases, disproportionation is more favored over recombination.

In a recombination step, two growing chain radicals (denoted by ^{•}) form a covalent bond in a single stable molecule. For the example of a vinyl polymer,

$$\ \Bigl[\!\!\!\!\ce{-CH2-CHX}^\bullet\Bigr] \quad + \quad \Bigl[\!\!\!\!\ce{-CH2-CHX}^\bullet\Bigr] \quad \longrightarrow \quad \Bigl[\!\!\!\!\ce{-CH2-CHX-CHX-CH2{}-}\!\!\!\!\Bigr]$$
Termination by recombination increases the chain length and therefore the molecular weight of the final polymer.

In a disproportionation step, one radical transfers a hydrogen atom to the other to form two stable molecules:

$$\ \Bigl[\!\!\!\!\ce{-CH2-CHX^\bullet}\Bigr] \quad + \quad \Bigl[\!\!\!\!\ce{-CH2-CHX^\bullet}\Bigr] \quad \longrightarrow \quad  \Bigl[\!\!\!\!\ce{-CH2-CH2X}\Bigr] \quad + \quad \Bigl[\!\!\!\!\ce{-CH=CHX}\Bigr]$$
Termination by disproportionation usually has a higher activation energy since it involves breaking of one bond, and therefore is more important at higher energy.

== Termination of cationic polymerization ==
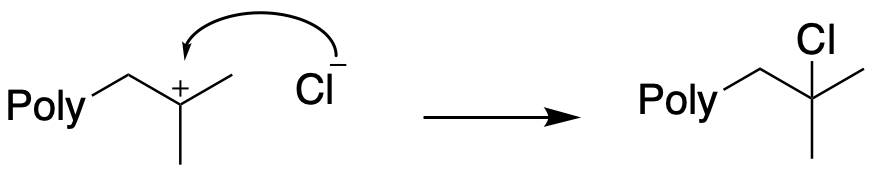
Chain termination by a halide

In cationic polymerization, termination can occur through the combination of the carbocation and the counter-ion, β-elimination, or chain transfer. In the first pathway, the counter-ion ends the chain by combining to the carbocation. For example, when cationic polymerization is initiated with a Lewis acid, the halide can dissociate from the Lewis acid and combine with the polymer at its propagating end, effectively ending the chain's growth.

In β-elimination, the halide used for initiation abstracts a hydride from the β-carbon, resulting in the loss of a carbocation and the subsequent formation of a stable alkene. The generation of the alkene terminates the chain, though it could be reinitiated under proper conditions.

Rather than terminating the chain completely, chain transfer can result in the termination of one chain and the initiation of another. In this pathway, a hydride is transferred from the monomer to the propagating end of a chain. As a result, a new chain is propagated from the monomer.

== Termination of anionic polymerization ==
Anionic polymerization occurs when a carbanion is formed at the propagating end of the chain. Monomers with electron withdrawing groups are used to stabilize the negative charge via delocalization. Thus, monomers such as styrene, methacrylate, and vinyl pyridine are often used for anionic polymerization. Unlike radical polymerization, termination via disproportionation and recombination does not occur, and this is due to unfavorable electrostatic interactions between the growing chains; namely, the repulsion between similar negative charges. Chain transfer is also absent in anionic polymerization because there is no proton readily available for transfer. For chain transfer to occur, a hydride would need to be abstracted from the propagating anion. However, the hydride transfer is thermodynamically unfavored and is not observed as a result. Instead of recombination, disproportionation, and chain transfer, termination can occur through the unintentional reaction between the propagating molecule and a trace impurity such as oxygen gas, carbon dioxide, and/or water molecules. Chain termination could also result from purposefully quenching the system with water molecules, alcohols, or other protonic reagents.

Living polymerization occurs when the propagating chain end does not spontaneously terminate, allowing the chain to grow at a constant rate. Living polymerization can be achieved through anionic polymerization, as termination typically does not occur unless the propagating end reacts with an impurity. In living polymerization, the anionic chain ends exist in an active and stable system that facilitates growth. Chain growth is halted once the monomer is depleted, but can be resumed upon the addition of more monomer. Block polymers can be synthesized through the addition of another monomer different from the one used in the initiation step. Through living polymerization, the molecular weight distribution of the polymer can be controlled and the polydispersity index can be narrowed.
