= Copper-based reversible-deactivation radical polymerization =

Copper-based reversible-deactivation radical polymerization (Cu-based RDRP) is a member of the class of reversible-deactivation radical polymerization. In this system, various copper species are employed as the transition-metal catalyst for reversible activation/deactivation of the propagating chains responsible for uniform polymer chain growth.

== History of Copper-catalyzed RDRP ==
Although copper complexes (in combination with relevant ligands) have long been used as catalysts for organic reactions such as atom transfer radical addition (ATRA) and copper(I)-catalyzed alkyne-azide cycloaddition (CuAAC), copper complex catalyzed RDRP was not reported until 1995 when Jin-Shan Wang and Krzysztof Matyjaszewski introduced it as atom transfer radical polymerization (ATRP). ATRP with copper as catalyst quickly became one of the most robust and commonly used RDRP techniques for designing and synthesizing polymers with well-defined composition, functionalities, and architecture. Due to some inherited drawbacks, such the persistent radical effect (PRE), several advanced ATRP techniques have been developed, including activators regenerated by electron transfer (ARGET) ATRP and initiators for continuous activator regeneration (ICAR) ATRP.

One intriguing catalyst, metallic copper, has also been applied to these modified ATRP systems. The polymerization using Cu(0) and suitable ligands was introduced for the first time by Krzysztof Matyjaszewski in 1997. However, then, in 2006, the Cu(0) – mediated RDRP of MA (in combination with tris(2-(dimethylamino)ethyl)amine(Me6TREN) as ligand in polar solvents) was reported, with a very different mechanism, single electron transfer living radical polymerization (SET-LRP) postulated by Virgil Percec. Initiated by this mechanistic difference, many research articles were published during recent years which aimed to shed a light on this specific polymerization reaction, and the discussion of the mechanisms has been a very striking episode in the field of polymer science.

== Discussion of the mechanism ==
=== Supplemental activator and reducing agent atom-transfer radical polymerization (SARA ATRP) ===
In the case of RDRP reactions in the presence of Cu(0), one of the mechanistic models proposed in the literature is called the supplemental activator and reducing agent atom-transfer radical polymerization (SARA ATRP). The SARA ATRP is characterized by the traditional ATRP reactions of activation by Cu(I) and deactivation by Cu(II) at the core of the process, with Cu(0) acting primarily as a supplemental activator of alkyl halides and a reducing agent for the Cu(II) through comproportionation. There is minimal kinetic contribution of disproportionation because Cu(I) primarily activates alkyl halides and activation of all alkyl halides occurs by inner sphere electron transfer (ISET).

=== Single electron transfer living radical polymerization (SET-LRP) ===
Another model is called single-electron transfer living radical polymerization (SET-LRP), where Cu(0) is the exclusive activator of alkyl halides – a process that occurs by outer sphere electron transfer (OSET). The generated Cu(I) disproportionates ‘spontaneously’ into highly reactive ‘nascent’ Cu(0) and Cu(II) species, instead of participating in the activation of alkyl halides, and there is minimal comproportionation.

=== Copper-based reversible-deactivation radical polymerization (Cu-based RDRP) ===
One unique experimental phenomenon in the Cu(0)-mediated RDRP systems with Me_{6}TREN/DMSO as ligand/solvent is that the existence of an apparent induction period in the early stage and the absence of this induction period was observed by adding extra Cu(II) to the reaction system or employing PMDETA as ligand. This intriguing phenomenon cannot be explained either by SARA ATRP or SET-LRP, therefore, another mechanism was proposed by Wenxin Wang: copper-based reversible-deactivation radical polymerization (Cu-based RDRP) (previously called Cu(0)-mediated RDRP).

The Cu-based RDRP mechanism showed that induction period is originated from the accumulation of soluble copper species during that initial unstable stage. It was demonstrated that Cu(I) act as a powerful activator even under conditions favoring its disproportionation (in Me_{6}TREN/DMSO system), whilst Cu(0) is a supplemental activator and reducing agent and both disproportionation and comproportionation coexist. Cu(II) can be consumed by both the comproportionation and deactivation reaction, the relative extent of which depends on the reactivity of monomers and initiators.

In Cu-based RDRP systems, there are two coexisting equilibria which must be simultaneously considered - the polymerization equilibrium (chain propagation, activation/deactivation, chain termination) and the copper conversion equilibrium (disproportionation/disproportionation). Different polymerization parameters (initiator, ligand, and solvent etc.) affect the polymerization process by synergistically influencing these two equilibria. For different monomers, the characteristics of the above two equilibria will differ accordingly, thus requiring a reconsideration of the combination of polymerization parameters. Based on the proper understanding of the kinetic control mechanism of Cu-based RDRP, the long-standing challenges with the controlled polymerization of numerous monomers were overcame (low monomer conversion, poorly controlled MWs/MWDs, complex or multi reaction procedures, etc.), allowing the successful controlled polymerization of various vinyl monomers (ranging from the highly active AM, NIPAM, DMA, MA, etc. to the less active MMA, St, etc.).

== See also ==
- Reversible-deactivation radical polymerization
- Atom-transfer radical-polymerization
