= Catalytic chain transfer =

Chemical process

Catalytic chain transfer (CCT) is a process that can be incorporated into radical polymerization to obtain greater control over the resulting products.

== Introduction ==
Radical polymerization of vinyl monomers, such as methyl (metha)acrylate or vinyl acetate is a common (industrial) method to prepare polymeric materials. One of the problems associated with this method is, however, that the radical polymerisation reaction rate is so high that even at short reaction times the polymeric chains are exceedingly long. This has several practical disadvantages, especially for polymer processing (e.g. melt-processing). A solution to this problem is catalytic chain transfer, which is a way to make shorter polymer chains in radical polymerisation processes. The method involves adding a catalytic chain transfer agent to the reaction mixture of the monomer and the radical initiator.

== Historical background ==
Boris Smirnov and Alexander Marchenko (USSR) discovered in 1975 that cobalt porphyrins are able to reduce the molecular weight of PMMA formed during radical polymerization of methacrylates. Later investigations showed that the cobalt dimethylglyoxime complexes were as effective as the porphyrin catalysts and also less oxygen sensitive. Due to their lower oxygen sensitivity these catalysts have been investigated much more thoroughly than the porphyrin catalysts and are the catalysts actually used commercially.

== Process ==
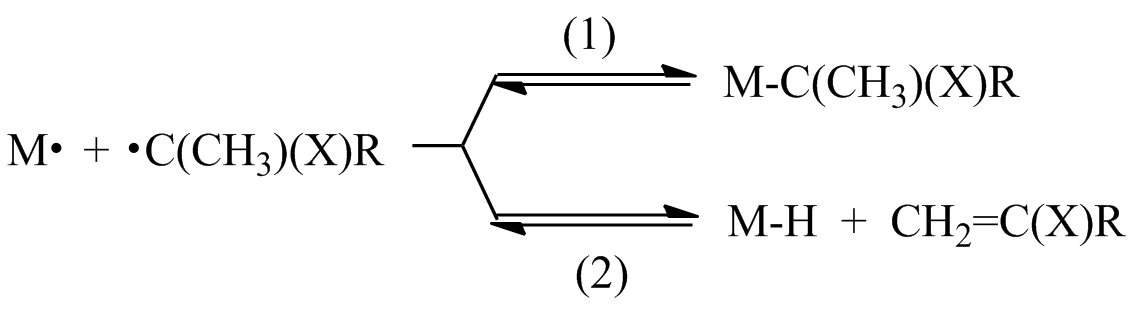

In general, reactions of organic free radicals (•C(CH_{3})(X)R) with metal-centered radicals (M•) either produce an organometallic complex (reaction 1) or a metal hydride (M-H) and an olefin (CH_{2}=C(X)R) by the metallo radical M• abstracting a β-hydrogen from the organic radical •C(CH_{3})(X)R (reaction 2). These organo-radical reactions with metal complexes provides several mechanisms to control radical polymerization of monomers CH_{2}=CH(X). A wide range of metal-centered radicals and organo-metal complexes manifest at least a portion of these reactions. Various transition metal species, including complexes of Cr(I), Mo(III), Fe(I), V(0), Ti(III), and Co(II) have been demonstrated to control molecular weights in radical polymerization of olefins.

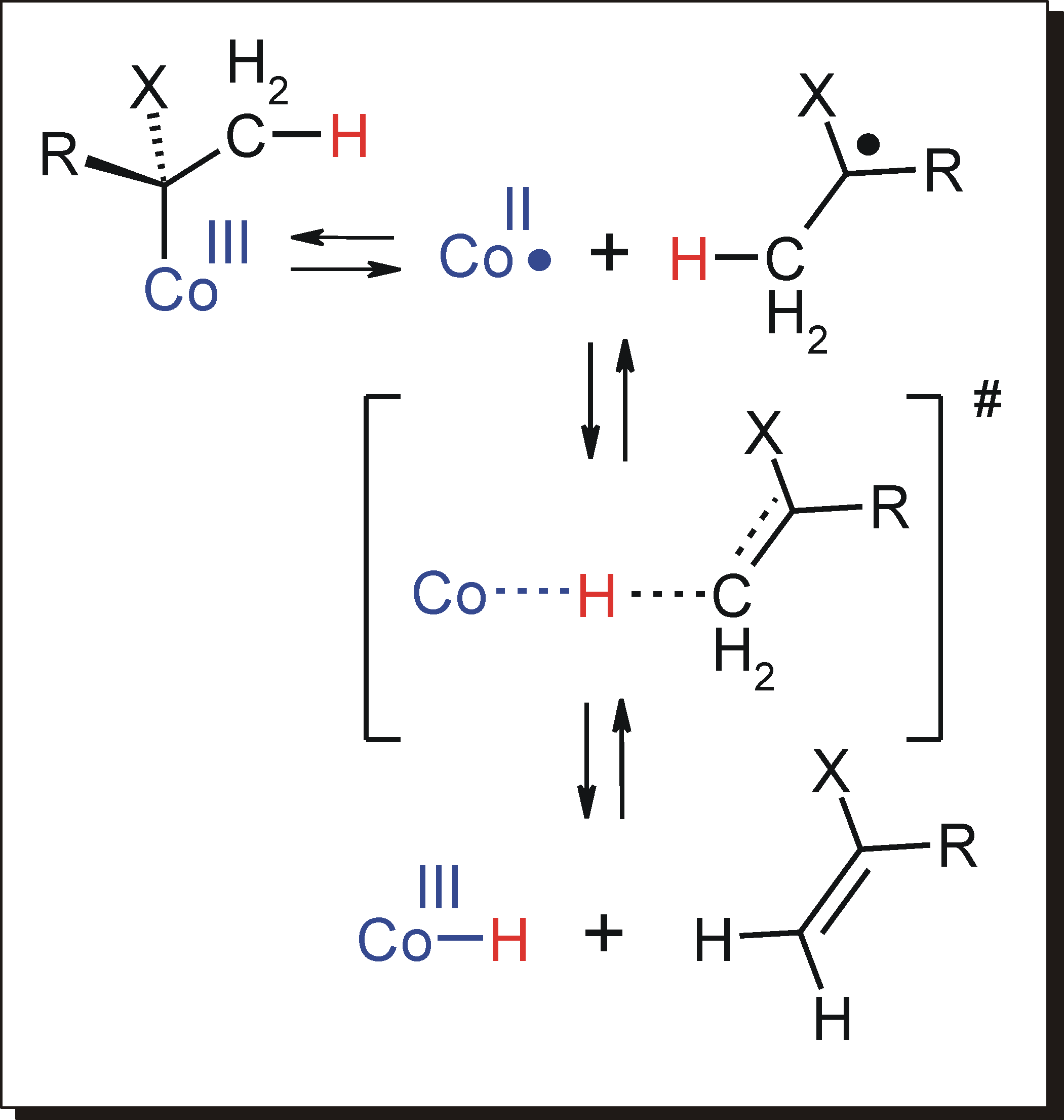

The olefin generating reaction 2 can become catalytic, and such catalytic chain transfer reactions are generally used to reduce the polymer molecular weight during the radical polymerization process. Mechanistically, catalytic chain transfer involves hydrogen atom transfer from the organic growing polymeryl radical to cobalt(II), thus leaving a polymer vinyl-end group and a cobalt-hydride species. The Co(por)(H) species has no cis-vacant site for direct insertion of a new olefinic monomer into the Co-H bond to finalize the chain-transfer process, and hence the required olefin insertion also proceeds via a radical pathway. The best recognized chain transfer catalysts are low spin cobalt(II) complexes and organo-cobalt(III) species, which function as latent storage sites for organo-radicals required to obtain living radical polymerization by several pathways.

The major products of catalytic chain transfer polymerization are vinyl terminated polymer chains. One of the major drawbacks of the process is that catalytic chain transfer polymerization does not produce macromonomers of use in free radical polymerizations, but instead produces addition-fragmentation agents. When a growing polymer chain reacts with the addition fragmentation agent the radical end-group attacks the vinyl bond and forms a bond. However, the resulting product is so hindered that the species undergoes fragmentation, leading eventually to telechelic species.

These addition fragmentation chain transfer agents do form graft copolymers with styrenic and acrylate species however they do so by first forming block copolymers and then incorporating these block copolymers into the main polymer backbone. While high yields of macromonomers are possible with methacrylate monomers, low yields are obtained when using catalytic chain transfer agents during the polymerization of acrylate and styrenic monomers. This has been seen to be due to the interaction of the radical centre with the catalyst during these polymerization reactions.

== Utility ==
The catalytic chain transfer process was commercialized very soon after its discovery. The initial commercial outlet was the production of chemically reactive macromonomers to be incorporated into paints for the automotive industry. Federally mandated VOC restrictions are leading to the elimination of solvents from the automotive finishes and the lower molecular weight chain transfer products are often fluids. Incorporation of monomers such as glycidyl methacrylate or hydroxyethylmethacrylate (HEMA) into the macromonomers aid curing processes. Macromonomers incorporating HEMA can be effective in the dispersion of pigments in the paints. The chemistry is very effective under emulsion polymerisation conditions and has been used in the printing industry since 2000. The vinylic end group acts as an addition fragmentation agent and has been utilised to make multi block copolymers and derivatives used as stress relief agents in dental restoration by 3M.

== See also ==
- Radical polymerization
- Living polymerization
- Cobalt Mediated Radical Polymerization
