= Cobalt-mediated radical polymerization =

Cobalt based catalysts, when used in radical polymerization, have several main advantages especially in slowing down the reaction rate, allowing for the synthesis of polymers with peculiar properties. As starting the reaction does need a real radical initiator, the cobalt species is not the only used catalyst, it is a mediator. For this reason, this type of reaction is referred to as cobalt mediated radical polymerization.

== Introduction ==
About half of all commercial polymers are produced by radical polymerization. Radical polymerization (RP) reactions have several advantageous properties:

- A wide variety of monomers can be polymerized.
- RP reactions are tolerant to various functional groups.
- RP reactions allow a large temperature range of operation (–100 to >200 °C).
- RP reactions are generally compatibility with several reactions conditions (bulk, solution, (mini)emulsion and suspension).
- RP reactions allow a relatively simple reactor set-up, and are hence costs effective.

However, conventional (free) RP reactions suffer from a lack of control over the polymer molecular-weights and weight distributions. A relatively narrow molecular weight-distribution (M_{w}/M_{n}) is usually desirable, as broad distribution negatively influence the polymer properties of (generally atactic) polymers produced by RP. Common RP also does not allow the formation of block copolymers. This is where controlled (or living) radical polymerization comes into play. Several CRP reactions have been developed over the past years, some of which capable of producing well-defined polymers with narrow molecular weight distributions.

Cobalt mediated radical polymerisation (CMRP) is one of these methods, which offers some specific advantages. Most notably, CMRP allows RP of a broad substrate scope (among others: acrylates, acrylic acid, vinyl esters, vinyl acetate, acrylonitrile, vinylpyrrolidone) under various reaction conditions, and, for some catalysts, gives access to very fast CRP reactions with rates approaching those of conventional uncontrolled free radical polymerization reactions.

Most commonly applied cobalt compounds are cobaloximes, cobalt porphyrins and Co(acac)_{2} derivatives, used in combination with various radical initiators (such as AIBN or V70).

Cobalt can control radical polymerization (RP) reactions by essentially three mechanisms:

1. Catalytic chain transfer (CCT)
2. Reversibile termination (RT), leading to the persistent radical effect (PRE)
3. Degenerative transfer (DT).

== Historical background ==
Cobalt mediated control of RP reactions through CCT was discovered by Smirnov and Marchenko in 1975. CMRP through reversible termination (persistent radical effect) was introduced in 1994.

More recent developments focus on CMRP via degenerative transfer (DT) mechanisms, and combinations of RT and DT mechanisms.

== Control via reversible termination (persistent radical effect) ==
Cobalt mediated radical polymerization

In many cases, CMRP exploits the weak cobalt(III)-carbon bond to control the radical polymerization reaction. The Co-C bond containing radical initiator easily breaks up (by heat or by light) in a carbon free radical and a cobalt(II) radical species. The carbon radical starts the growth of a polymer chain from the CH_{2}=CHX monomer as in a free radical polymerization reaction. Cobalt is unusual in that it can reversibly reform a covalent bond with the carbon radical terminus of the growing chain. This reduces the concentration of radicals to a minimum and thereby minimizes undesirable termination reactions by recombination of two carbon radicals. The cobalt trapping reagent is called a persistent radical and the cobalt-capped polymer chain is said to be dormant. This mechanism is called reversible termination and is said to operate via the "persistent radical effect". When the monomer lacks protons that can be easily abstracted by the cobalt radical, (catalytic) chain transfer is also limited and the RP reaction becomes close to ‘living’.

== Control via catalytic chain transfer ==
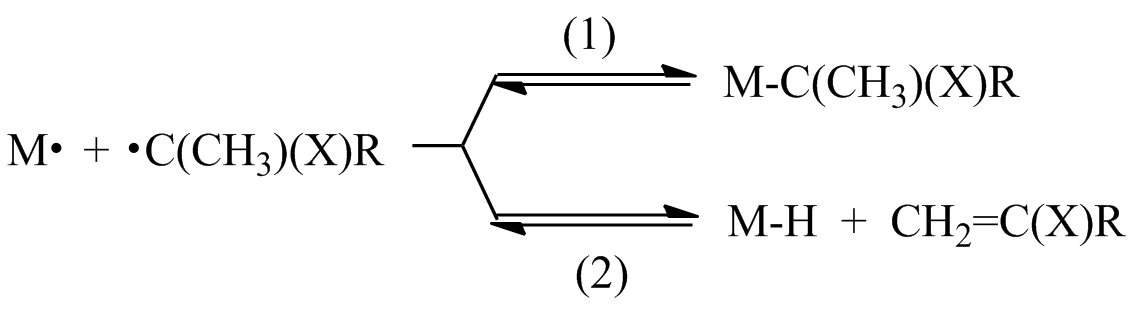

Catalytic chain transfer enables the synthesis of shorter polymer chains in a radical polymerization process. The method involves adding a catalytic chain transfer agent to the reaction mixture of the monomer and the radical initiator. Catalytic chain transfer proceeds via hydrogen atom transfer from the organic growing polymeryl radical to cobalt(II), producing a polymer vinyl-end group and a cobalt-hydride species (equilibrium 2). The Co-H species then reacts with the monomer to start a new Co(III)-alkyl species, which re-initiates a new growing polymeric radical (reversible termination, equilibrium 1). The main products of catalytic chain transfer polymerization are therefore vinyl terminated polymer chains which are shorter than in conventional (free) radical polymerization.

== Control via degenerative transfer ==
One of the disadvantages of controlled radical polymerization reactions is that they tend to become rather slow. Controlled polymerization conditions are usually achieved by extending the life-time of the growing polymer chain radical, by keeping it in a dormant state for most of the time (known as the Persistent Radical Effect). Thereby the control agent substantially slows-down the over-all radical polymerisation reaction. However, some CMRP reactions proceed via a different mechanism, called degenerative transfer (DT), which allows controlled radical polymerization reactions to proceed at roughly the same rate as any uncontrolled free radical polymerisation.

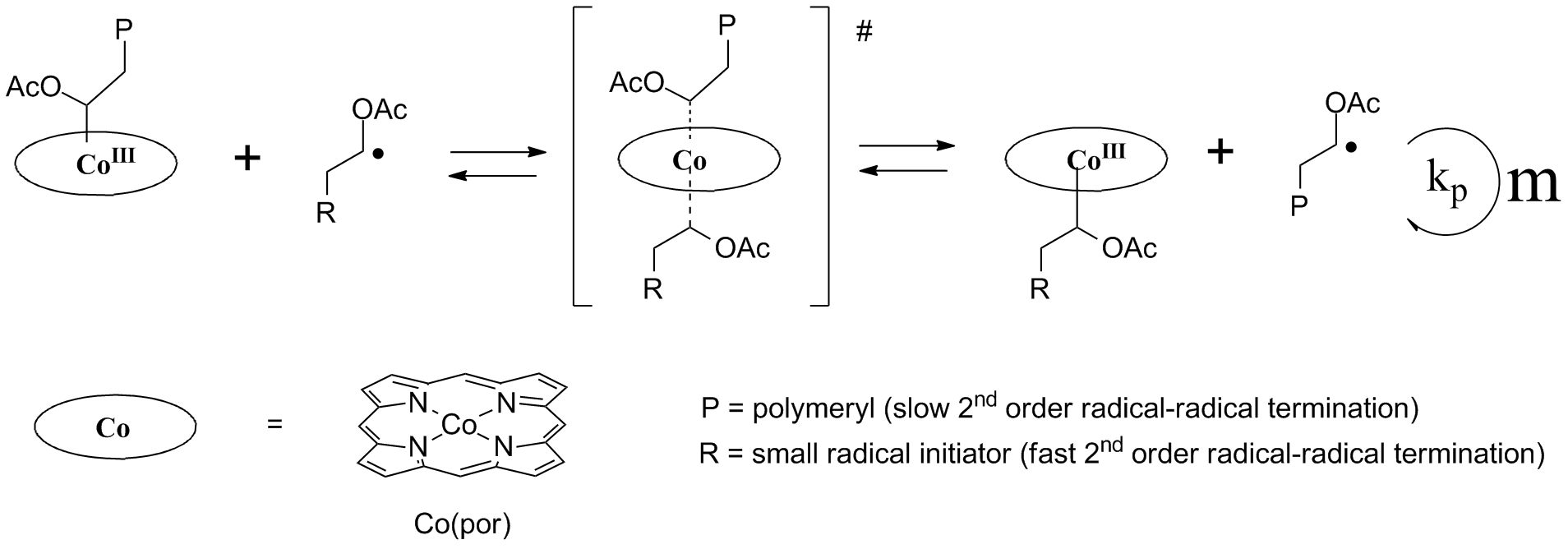

The degenerative transfer mechanism is based on very fast exchange equilibria between small free radicals (being continuously injected into the solution) and dormant polymeryl radicals (protected as closed-shell cobalt species). Systems based on degenerative transfer do not proceed via the persistent radical effect (PRE). Instead an active propagating radical interchanges its role with a latent radical in a dormant complex. The activation of one polymer chain means the deactivation of another polymer chain. If the exchange process is much faster than the polymerisation rate (k_{p}), effectively all polymer chains grow at the same rate. Because the large polymer chains diffuse much slower than the small organic radicals, and thereby terminate much slower via 2nd order radical-radical coupling or disproportionation, long chains effectively build-up at cobalt while the small radicals keep terminating. This leads to a desirable narrow molecular weight distribution of the polymer at high polymerization rates. DT-CMRP is an associative process, which for Co^{III}(por)(alkyl) species implies formation of a 6-coordinate intermediate or transition state. Such Co(por)(alkyl)_{2} species formally have a Co(+IV) oxidation state, but in reality their (electronic) structure is best described as a weak radical adduct of a Co^{III}(por)(alkyl) species. A striking feature of DT-CMRP is the fact that even upon using a large excess of the radical initiator compared to the transfer agent, the radical polymerization reactions still remains controlled. A satisfactory explanation for this phenomenon seems to be lacking at the moment.

== See also ==
- Catalytic chain transfer
- Radical polymerization
- Living polymerization
