= Reversible-deactivation polymerization =

Type of chain polymerization

IUPAC definition

Chain polymerization, propagated by chain carriers that are deactivated reversibly,
bringing them into active-dormant equilibria of which there might be more than one.

Note: examples of reversible-deactivation polymerization are group-transfer
polymerization, reversible-deactivation radical polymerization (RDRP),
reversible addition−fragmentation chain-transfer polymerization (RAFT)
and atom-transfer radical polymerization (ATRP).

In polymer chemistry, reversible-deactivation polymerization (RDP) is a form of polymerization propagated by chain carriers, some of which at any instant are held in a state of dormancy through an equilibrium process involving other species.

An example of reversible-deactivation anionic polymerization (RDAP) is group transfer polymerization of alkyl methacrylates, where the initiator and the dormant state is a silyl ketene acetal.

In the case of reversible-deactivation radical polymerization (RDRP), a majority of the chain must be held in a dormant state to ensure that the concentration of active carriers is sufficiently low as to render chain termination reactions negligible.

Despite having some common features, RDP is distinct from living polymerization which requires a complete absence of termination and irreversible chain transfer.
