= Mitsuo Sawamoto =

Japanese chemist (born 1954)

- Born: December 12, 1954 (age 71); Kyoto, Japan
- Citizenship: Japan
- Education: Kyoto University
- Known for: Atom-transfer radical-polymerization
- Awards: Medal with Purple Ribbon (2015); Humboldt Prize (2016); Franklin Institute Award in Chemistry (2017)
- Scientific career
- Fields: Polymer chemistry Organometallic chemistry
- Workplaces: University of Akron; Kyoto University; Chubu University
- Doctoral advisor: Toshinobu Higashimura

Mitsuo Sawamoto (澤本 光男 Sawamoto Mitsuo, December 12, 1954) is a Japanese chemist specializing in the field of polymer chemistry, Emeritus Professor at Kyoto University, professor at Chubu University.

He is co-recipient of the Franklin Institute Award in Chemistry in 2017 with Krzysztof Matyjaszewski, for their independent discover of Atom-transfer radical-polymerization (ATRP).

== Early life and education ==
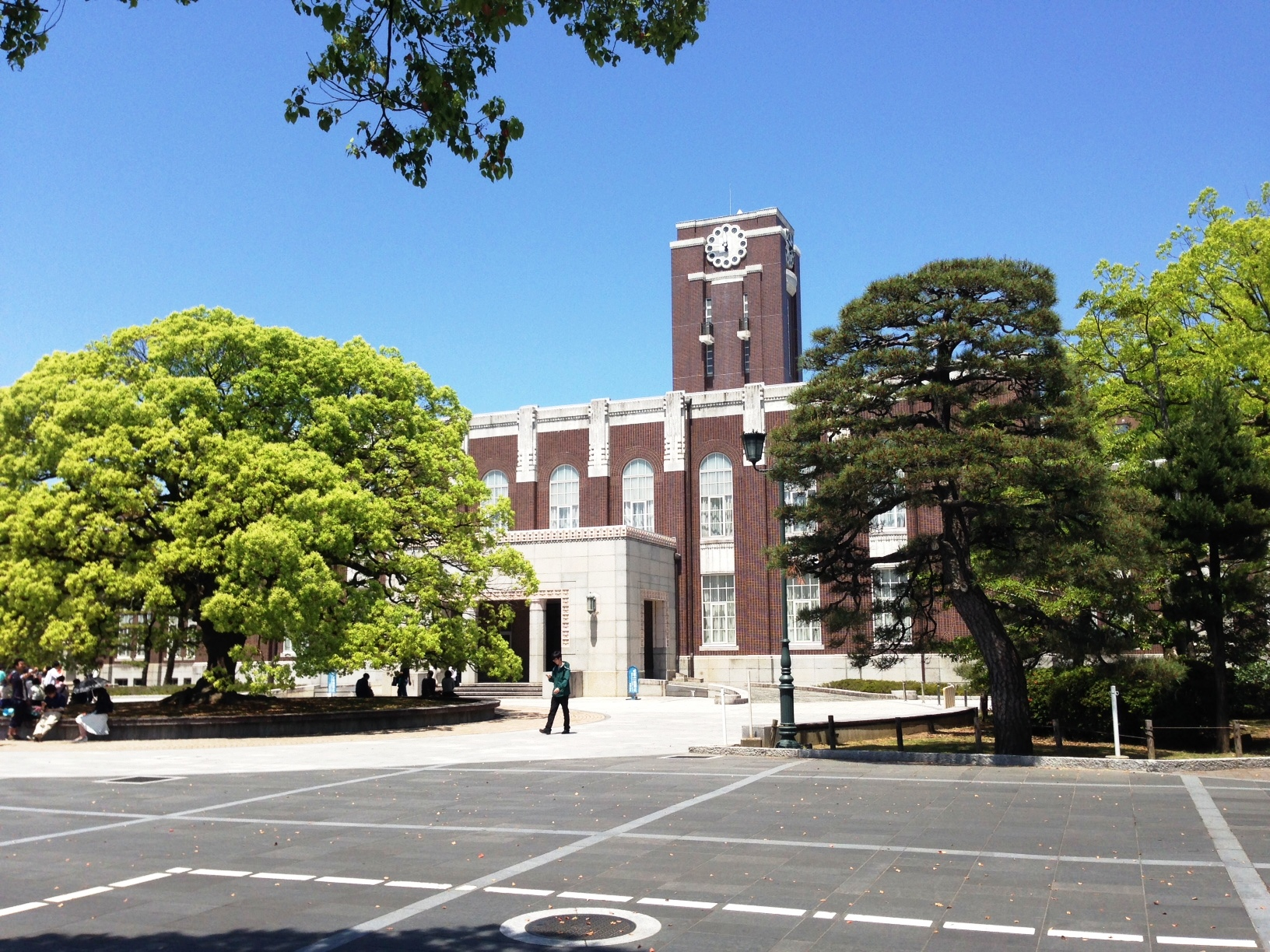
Sawamoto graduated from Kyoto University.

Sawamoto was born in Kyoto, Japan, on December 12, 1954. He received his BSc, MSc and PhD degree in 1974, 1976 and 1979, respectively, from Kyoto University.

== Career ==
From 1980 to 1981, he worked as a postdoctoral scientist at the University of Akron, becoming a professor at Akron in 1981. A decade later, he moved to the Graduate School of Engineering of Kyoto University, where he was a professor of polymer chemistry.

From 2008 to 2010 Sawamoto was president of The Society of Polymer Science, Japan (SPSJ). He is currently a member of the Science Council of Japan. He is one of the editors of Journal of Polymer Science Part A.

== Research ==
Sawamoto discovered the world's first living cationic polymerization and developed numerous initiator systems (Macromolecules, 1984; Progress in Polymer Science, 1991). In addition, he realized the world's first living free-radical polymerization by a metal complex and developed numerous initiator systems (Macromolecules, 1995; Chemical Reviews, 2001).

In 1995, Sawamoto and Krzysztof Matyjaszewski described Atom-transfer radical-polymerization (ATRP) almost simultaneously and independently.

Until 2008, Sawamoto published more than 350 original works and more than 30 systematic reviews. Among them, in the field of organic chemistry, his total citation times (1997-2001) was ranked first in Japan, and third in the world.

This series of research inspired many studies internationally in not only polymer chemistry but also related fields such as organometallic chemistry, and its ripple effect is particularly noticeable.

Sawamoto was given a quote in March 2011:

Miraculous, ingenious, creative but sincere:
This is catalytic science research is all about.

== Recognition ==
- 1997: The Award of the Society of Polymer Science, Japan
- 1999: The Award of the Chemical Society of Japan
- 2002: The Arthur K. Doolittle Award (Royal Society of Chemistry)
- 2012: Macro Group UK Medal for Outstanding Achievementin Polymer Science
- 2013: SPSJ Award for Outstanding Achievement in Polymer Science and Technology
- 2014: NIMS Award
- 2015: Medal with Purple Ribbon
- 2016: Humboldt Prize
- 2017: Franklin Institute Award in Chemistry
- 2021: Clarivate Citation Laureates
- 2025: Person of Cultural Merit

== See also ==
- Atom-transfer radical-polymerization
- Copper(0)-mediated reversible-deactivation radical polymerization
- Diethylzinc
