= Chubu University =

University in Kasugai, Japan

- 中部大学
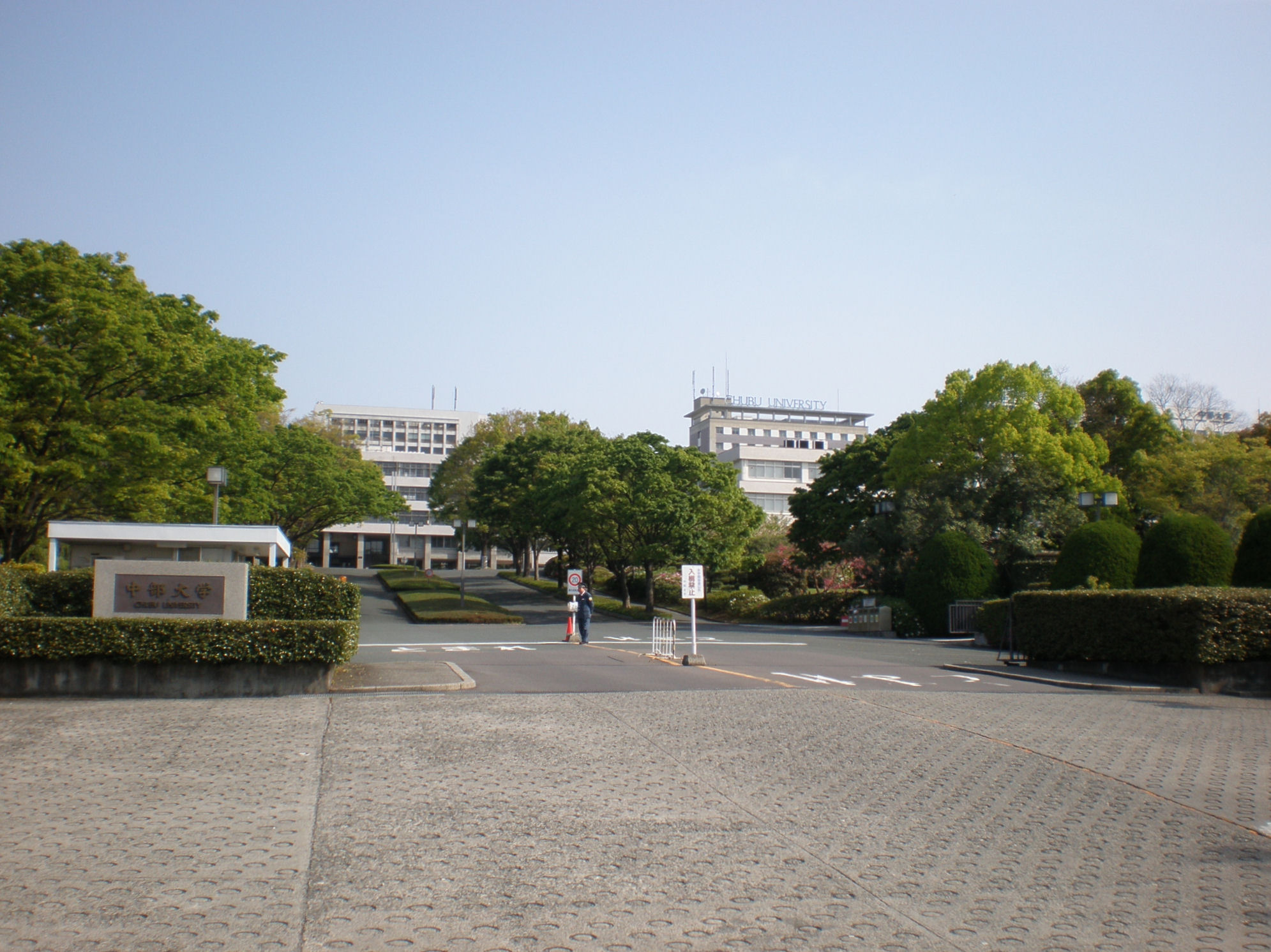
- Type: Private
- Established: 1964
- Location: Kasugai, Aichi, Japan; 35.2742°N 137.016°E
- Website: www.chubu.ac.jp/english/index.html

Chubu University (中部大学, Chūbu Daigaku) is a private university in Kasugai, Aichi, Japan.

Chubu University was established as the Chubu Institute of Technology in 1964 with the motto "Acta, non Verba" (Actions, not Words), but its institutional history begins with the Nagoya Daichi High School established in 1938. It was renamed as Chubu University in 1984, and has been subsequently expanded to comprise seven schools and six graduate schools, with about 11,000 students and twenty research institutions.

== Location ==
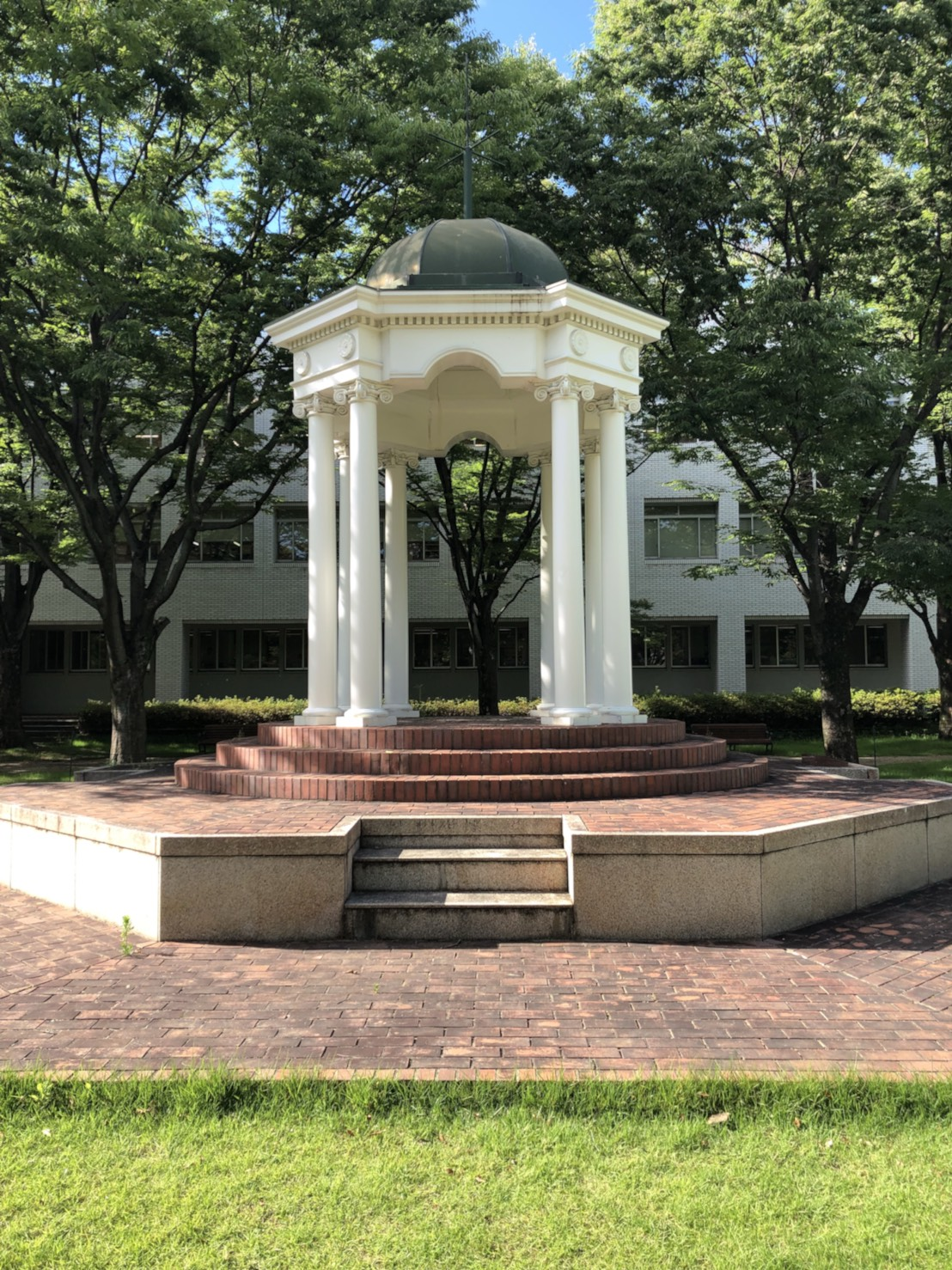
The Chubu University Rotunda.

It is located on a hill with full of green trees in City of Kasugai neighboring in the north of City of Nagoya with the population of 2.3 million, the central city of Chubu (meaning Central Japan). There are Japanese major industries such as automobile industry including Toyota and Honda, aerospace industry including Heavy Industries of Mitsubishi and Kawasaki as well as small high skill manufacturers producing one-third of parts of Boeing jets and Mitsubishi Regional Jet, textile industry including Toray producing carbon fiber. Chubu University has strong connections with these big and small industries.

== Sustainability sciences ==
Whilst, Chubu University has promoted sustainability sciences including certified as a Regional Center of UNESCO ESD (Education for Sustainable Development), and the connections with NASA in digital earth research, with Club of Rome and United Nations Center for Regional Development in global critical issues, SDGs and quality of life and with JICA (Japan International Cooperation Agency) in smart transport and city planning in developing countries.

== Distinguished scholars and their research ==
Chancellor Atsuo Iiyoshi, the plasma physicist, was the leader of Japan team in international competition in nuclear fusion method in 80’s and President of National Institute for Fusion Science. President Osamu Ishihara, also plasma physicist, has experienced to teach in US for 25 years and Life fellow of IEEE. Okitsugu Yamashita, Ex President, is an entomologist and received prizes such as Louis Pasteur Prize.

Institute of Science and technology are gathering eminent researchers including Hisashi Yamamoto (Catalyst Chemistry, President of Japan Society of Chemistry, awarded including Japan Academy Prize, Roger Adams Prize), Mitsuo Sawamoto (Molecule Chemistry, awarded including Benjamin Franklin Medal) and Yoshitsugu Hayashi (Sustainable and Well-being City, Full Member of Club of Rome, President of World Conference on Transport Research Society).

Researchers at the Chubu Institute for Advanced Studies include Takaho Ando, a historian of philosophy and recipient of the Japan Academy Prize; Hiromichi Fukui, whose research focuses on Digital Earth; and Kimitaka Kawamura, an atmospheric chemist and a Geochemical Fellow of the Geochemical Society.

== Visiting Scholars ==
Chubu University gathers eminent visiting professors including Kōichirō Matsuura (Emeritus Member of the Club of Rome, former Director-General of UNESCO), Alexander Likhotal (Full Member of Club of Rome, Ex.President of Green Cross International, Spokesman under President Gorbachev of Soviet Union), Timothy Foresman (Principal Researcher for Digital Earth Project under Vice-President Al Gore), etc.

== Outreaching activities to local society ==
Outreach activities of the university are extended to local society very actively. A competitive fund was awarded for the revitalization of Kozoji New Town, which was constructed as one of the big new towns built in Tokyo, Nagoya and Osaka metropolitan areas in 1970’s and has been recently declining due to the aging of inhabitants. Cultural events such as Chubu University Music Festival, Adult College, and Kids Seminar are popular among the local citizens.

== Sports ==
Chubu University is active also in sports, particularly in handball, kendo and baseball, of which teams have been always selected to Japanese university championship. The Handball club became the Champion in 2014. Also, professional baseball players have been produced. It has excellent sports facilities including all-weather 400m x 6 lane track, 4-story budo (kendo, judo) arena, one of the best among Japanese universities.

== International Affiliations ==
Chubu University has 44 international affiliations as listed below. Amongst them, 50 years long special cooperation with Ohio University since 1973 is worthy of special mention. PASEO (Preparation for Academic Study in English Overseas) in Chubu University was originally started in 1991 in which lecturers sent by Ohio University are teaching. Student exchange has counted several hundred during 40 years. Yamada House in Ohio University campus was donated by Chubu University and Cupola in Chubu University campus was donated by Ohio University.

=== USA ===
- Ohio University
- West Virginia University
- Michigan State University

=== Canada ===
- University of British Columbia

=== Mexico ===
- Universidad de Guanajuato

=== Germany ===
- Friedrich-Schiller-Universität Jena
- Johannes Gutenberg-Universität Mainz

=== France ===
- ENSEIRB-MATMECA (École Nationale Supérieure d'Électronique, Informatique, Télécommunications, Mathématique et Mécanique de Bordeaux)
- Université de La Rochelle

=== Switzerland ===
- University of Zurich

=== UK ===
- Eckersley Oxford

=== Russia ===
- Research and Development Center at Federal Grid Company of Unified Energy System

=== Lithuania ===
- Vytauto Didžiojo Universitetas

=== Australia ===
- University of New England

=== Korea ===
- Wonkwang University

=== Thailand ===
- Chulalongkorn University, Faculty of Engineering
- King Mongkut’s Institute of Technology Ladkrabang
- Asian Institute of Technology

=== Malaysia ===
- Universiti Sains Malaysia

=== Indonesia ===
- Universitas Gadjah Mada
- Syiah Kuala University, Faculty of Agriculture

=== India ===
- Indian Institute of Technology Guwahati
- Tata Institute of Fundamental Research

=== China ===
- Harbin University of Science and Technology
- China Foreign Affairs University
- East China Normal University
- Tongji University
- Harbin Institute of Technology
- Anhui University of Science and Technology
- China Huadian Electric Power Research Institute
- Institute of Electrical Engineering, Chinese Academy of Science
- Tongji Zhejiang College
- Northeastern University, Institute of Materials and Metallurgy
- Jiaxing University
- Shaoxing University

=== Nepal ===
- Kathmandu University
- ICIMOD: International Center for Integrated Mountain Development

=== Bhutan ===
- The Council for Renewable Natural Resources Research of Bhutan

=== Fiji ===
- Fiji National University

=== Morocco ===
- Université Mohammed V

=== Tunisia ===
- University of Tunis El Manar

=== Algeria ===
- University of Science and Technology of Oran Mohamed Boudiaf
