= Persistent radical effect =

The persistent radical effect (PRE) in chemistry describes and explains the selective product formation found in certain free-radical cross-reactions. In these types of reactions, different radicals compete in secondary reactions. The so-called persistent (long-lived) radicals do not self-terminate and only react in cross-couplings. In this way, the cross-coupling products in the product distribution are more prominent.

The effect was first described in 1936 by Bachmann & Wiselogle. They heated pentaphenylethane and observed that the main reaction product was the starting product (87%) with only 2% of tetraphenylethane formed. They concluded that the dissociation of pentaphenylethane into triphenylmethyl and diphenylmethyl radicals was reversible and that persistent triphenylmethyl did not self terminate and transient diphenylmethyl did to a certain extent. In 1964, Perkins performed a similar reaction with phenylazotriphenylmethane in benzene. Again, the dimerization product of the persistent radical (phenylcyclohexydienyl) was absent as reaction product. In 1981, Geiger and Huber found that the photolysis of dimethylnitrosamine into dimethylaminyl radical and nitrous oxide was also completely reversible. A similar effect was observed by Kräutler in 1984 for methylcobalamin. The term 'persistent radical effect' was coined in 1992 by Daikh and Finke in their work related to the thermolysis of a cyanocobalamin model compound.

The PRE is a kinetic feature which provides a self-regulating effect in certain controlled/living radical polymerization systems such as atom transfer radical polymerization and nitroxide mediated polymerization. Propagating radicals P_{n}* are rapidly trapped in the deactivation process (with a rate constant of deactivation, k_{deact}) by species X, which is typically a stable radical such as a nitroxide. The dormant species are activated (with a rate constant k_{act}) either spontaneously/thermally, in the presence of light, or with an appropriate catalyst (as in ATRP) to reform the growing centers. Radicals can propagate (k_{p}) but also terminate (k_{t}). However, persistent radicals (X), as stated above, cannot terminate with each other but only (reversibly) cross-couple with the growing species (k_{deact}). Thus, every act of radical–radical termination is accompanied by the irreversible accumulation of X. Consequently, the concentration of radicals as well as the probability of termination decreases with time. The growing radicals (established through the activation–deactivation process) then predominantly react with X rather than with themselves.
