= Sodium polyacrylate =

Anionic polyelectrolyte polymer

Names
- IUPAC name Poly(sodium prop-2-enoate)

Identifiers
CAS Number	9003-04-7 (2500000 MW)
ECHA InfoCard	100.118.171
EC Number	618-349-8
UNII	05I15JNI2J (2500000 MW)
CompTox Dashboard (EPA)	DTXSID0049783

Properties
Chemical formula	(C_{3}H_{3}NaO_{2})_{n}
Molar mass	Variable
Density	1.22 g/cm^{3}
- Except where otherwise noted, data are given for materials in their standard state (at 25 °C [77 °F], 100 kPa). verify (what is ?) Infobox references

Sodium polyacrylate (ACR, ASAP, or PAAS), also known as waterlock, is a sodium salt of polyacrylic acid with the chemical formula [−CH_{2}−CH(CO_{2}Na)−]_{n} and has broad applications in consumer products. This super-absorbent polymer (SAP) has the ability to absorb 100 to 1000 times its mass in water. Sodium polyacrylate is an anionic polyelectrolyte with negatively charged carboxylic groups in the main chain. It is a polymer made up of chains of acrylate compounds. It contains sodium, which gives it the ability to absorb large amounts of water. When dissolved in water, it forms a thick and transparent solution due to the ionic interactions of the molecules. Sodium polyacrylate has many favorable mechanical properties. Some of these advantages include good mechanical stability, high heat resistance, and strong hydration.

While sodium neutralized polyacrylic acids are the most common form used in industry, there are also other salts available including potassium, lithium and ammonium. The origins of super-absorbent polymer chemistry trace back to the early 1960s when the U.S. Department of Agriculture (USDA) developed the first super-absorbent polymer materials.

== Background and history ==
Super-absorbent polymers (SAPs) similar to sodium polyacrylate were developed in the 1960s by the U.S. Department of Agriculture. Before the development of these substances, the best water absorbing materials were cellulosic or fiber-based like tissue paper, sponge, cotton, or fluff pulp. These materials can only retain 20 times their weight in water, whereas sodium polyacrylate can retain hundreds of times its weight in water. The USDA was interested in developing this technology because they wanted to find materials that could improve water conservation in soil. Through extensive research, they found that the gels they created did not expel water as fiber-based materials would. Early adopters of this technology were Dow Chemical, Hercules, General Mills Chemical, and DuPont. Ultra-thin baby diapers were some of the first hygiene products to be developed which use only a fraction of the material compared to fluff pulp diapers. Super-absorbent technology is in high demand in the disposable hygiene industry for products like diapers and sanitary napkins. SAPs used in hygiene products are typically sodium neutralized whereas SAPs used in agricultural applications are potassium neutralized.

== Fabrication methods ==
=== Overview ===
Methods to fabricate sodium polyacrylate, like solution polymerization in water, inverse emulsion polymerization, inverse suspension polymerization, plasma polymerization, and pressure-induced polymerization have been employed to synthesize various polyacrylates. However, the process to obtain a solid-state product using these methods requires a lot of equipment and is very expensive. The products obtained from these methods also have defects like poor solubility and broad molecular weight distribution. Despite having drawbacks, the polymerization methods aforementioned are often used to form sodium polyacrylate and other SAPs.

During solution polymerization, monomers are dissolved in a solvent that contains a catalyst to induce polymerization. Solution polymerization in water utilizes water as the solvent which means that the end product formed from the reaction is soluble in water. Inverse emulsion polymerization requires water, monomers, and a surfactant. Also, inverse emulsion polymerization is used to polymerize hydrophilic monomers. Hydrophobic monomers are emulsified through an aqueous phase. Free radicals are created in order to produce the polymer with either water or oil soluble initiators. Inverse suspension polymerization is carried out by using an aqueous solution of the monomer, cross-linking agent, and initiator which is then added to an organic phase which is stabilized by a surfactant. Plasma polymerization utilizes a range of technologies such as electron beams, ultraviolet radiation, or glow discharge in order to form polymers from a vapor made out of monomers. Gas discharge provided through this process initiates the polymerization of a group of monomers. Finally, pressure-induced polymerization applies pressure or compressive forces to solutions of monomers in order to create units which undergo polymerization and produce polymers.

Another method tested in a study to produce sodium polyacrylate as an alternative to current methods began with Butyl acrylate-acrylic acid copolymer and poly (butyl acrylate). They were synthesized via suspension polymerization by using butyl acrylate as the main monomer and acrylic acid as a secondary monomer. Suspension polymerization uses physical and mechanical movement and agitation in order to mix monomers to form polymers. This process requires dispersing medium, monomers, stabilizing agents, and initiators. Next, the polymers were swollen in ethanol and hydrolyzed in an aqueous solution of sodium hydroxide. Finally, water-soluble sodium polyacrylates were obtained by washing and drying the hydrolyzed resultant. This is a different method compared to the manufacturing processes that have been previously utilized, but could be a potential method to specifically manufacture sodium polyacrylate. Overall, the various production methods of sodium polyacrylate will influence its swelling capability, absorbency, and other mechanical properties. It is also important to consider cost and feasibility when manufacturing polymers like sodium polyacrylate.

=== Super-absorbent nanofibers (SANs) ===
Super-absorbent polymers are an innovative class of hydrogel products that can be used in many applications including hygiene products, drug delivery systems, agriculture, biomedicine, and wastewater treatment. A method called electrospinning is used to fabricate super-absorbent nanofibers (SANs) because of their advantageous properties like high surface area and porous structure. Electrospinning is a simple method that uses an electric field that collects filaments by forcing polymer melts or solutions. SANs have been successfully created by using sodium polyacrylate and poly(vinyl alcohol) (PVA) as a polymer matrix, which is a water-soluble polymer that is highly hydrophilic. As a result of this method of fabrication, SANs created in a study displayed high rates of absorption due to the capillary phenomenon shown by their highly porous structures. Also, the cross-linking structure improved the water absorption ability of the SANs. Adding PVA in this case gave structural stability to the SAN and prevented it from being dissolved in water. Overall, sodium polyacrylate can be combined with PVA in a nanofiber to produce a strong and effective structure.

This technology could have many applications in various industrial fields because of the fast and high absorbency as well as the sustainable structure of the SANs which was produced through relatively easy and simple processing methods. The SANs were very effective when absorbing water since there was an increase in the absorption area. The swelling ratio also increased because of the cross-links and highly porous nature of the nanowebs.

== Composites ==
=== Clay–polymer hydrogels ===
Studies have been conducted which observe the effect of the mechanical properties of hydrogels based on the amount of clay combined with the polymer. When combining polymers with clay, the results are promising, showing an increase in the elastic modulus and the tensile strength of clay–polymer hydrogels. In general, combining inorganic substances with polymers can improve the electrical, mechanical, thermal, and gas barrier properties of materials like hydrogels. In order to obtain these results, ultra-high molecular mass polymers higher than a few millions are recommended to be used so that the mechanical properties can improve regardless of the type of polymer used.

The mechanical properties for clay–polymer hydrogels have been studied including clay and polyethylene oxide (PEO) as well as clay and sodium polyacrylate (PAAS). A study compared laponite/PEO and laponite/PAAS blend hydrogels. Laponite is a synthetic clay that has the ability to swell when placed in water. The results showed that both hydrogels have a similar elastic modulus. However, the tensile strength of laponite/PAAS is much stronger than laponite/PEO blend hydrogels. The reason for this difference is based on the clay–polymer interaction strength in each hydrogel blend. In laponite/PAAS, the interaction is much stronger compared to the laponite/PEO blend.

=== Metal ions ===
Experiments and studies have shown that the incorporation of 0.3 wt% sodium polyacrylate in collagen (Co) fibers can improve the mechanical properties and thermal stability of the composite films. Sodium polyacrylate can form films and composites with different cationic polymers, proteins, and other substances, all of which can benefit the properties of the resulting film. Furthermore, sodium polyacrylate has the potential to combine with metal ions because of its characteristic polyanionic property which would allow for more reinforcing of the material. When collagen and sodium polyacrylate (Co-PAAS) blend films were combined with Ca^{2+}, Fe^{3+}, and Ag^{+} ranging from 0.001 to 0.004 mol/g, the surface of the composites became coarser and the internal structure became more stratified as more metal ions were added. When the ions were added, tensile strength increased. The optimal amounts for each ion are as follows: Ca^{2+} (0.003 mol/g), Fe^{3+} (0.002 mol/g), and Ag^{+} (0.001 mol/g). The composite films also had better thermal stability.

Overall, the study showed that metal ions added to Co-PAAS blend composite films can be used as an alternative to reinforce collagenous composite materials. These three ions were combined with the Co-PAAS film because of their relevant biological applications. Ca^{2+} is one of the major elements in animal tissues including bone and teeth and has a strong interaction with collagen. Next, Fe^{3+} is an important trace element in the human body and participates in protein chelation. Finally, Ag^{+} has antibacterial properties and can improve the stability and transparency of the Co-PAAS film.

=== Chitosan ===
Sodium polyacrylate is a commonly used electronegative polyelectrolyte which could be used to construct self-healing hydrogels and super-absorbents. Novel chitosan/sodium polyacrylate polyelectrolyte complex hydrogels (CPG) have been fabricated successfully in a study by cross-linking chitosan and sodium polyacrylate with epichlorohydrin (ECH) through the inhibiting protonation effect of chitosan in an alkali/urea aqueous solution. The CPG had a high swelling ratio because of sodium polyacrylate and acted differently in various pH solutions, physiological solutions, and salt solutions with different concentrations. As a result, CPG had smart responsive properties to different situations and exhibited high compressive strength, good biocompatibility and in vitro biodegradability. This fabrication process has shown success and has potential applications in the fields of agriculture, foods, tissue engineering, and drug delivery.

== Applications ==
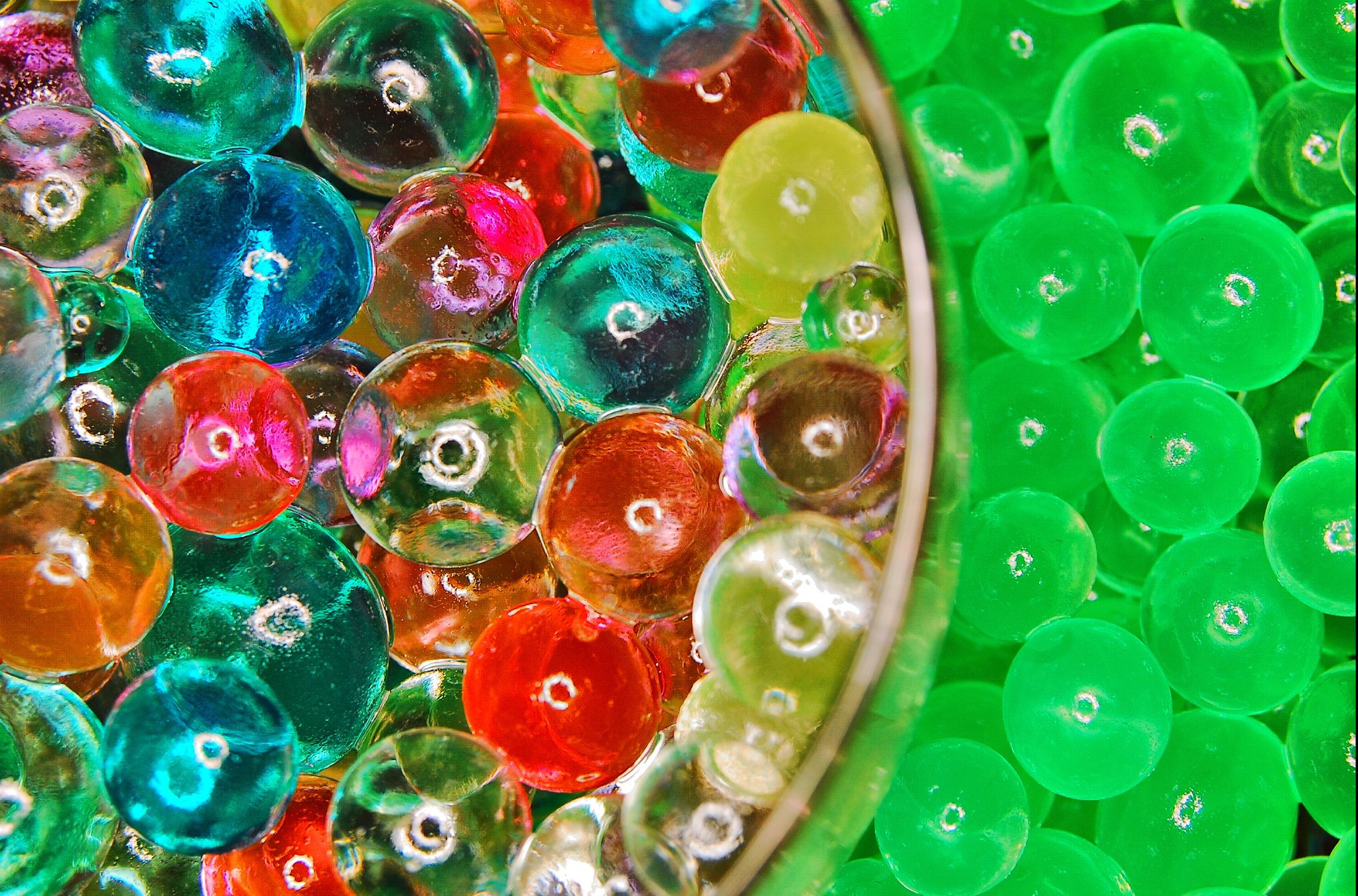
Dyed sodium polyacrylate hydrogel beads

=== Overview ===
Water-soluble polymers are used in many industries, especially polyacrylates. Some applications include thickeners, flocculants, dispersants, and drag reducing agents. Polyacrylates are also used as environmentally friendly adhesives or coatings.

In addition, sodium polyacrylate is used in paper diapers and Maximum Absorbency Garments as the absorbent material. It is also used in ice packs to convert the water used as the cooling agent into a gel, in order to reduce spillage in case the ice pack leaks. Sodium polyacrylate has also been studied for utilization in many applications such as nanofiltration of water to absorb water and concentrate the liquid with microbes. Also, it is used for eco-engineering as a water-retaining agent in rocky slopes for increasing moisture availability in the soil.

This can improve the water retention availability of the soil and infiltration capacity in sandy soil. Below is a table containing categories and lists of some products and applications that utilize sodium polyacrylate:

Sodium Polyacrylate Applications Overview
Health care	Animals	Industry	Environment	Other products
Paper/disposable diaper (baby, child, and adult); Sanitary napkin; Nursing mat; Medical bandage; Wound dressings	Pet pad; Horse urine odor absorbing; Drown-free water source for feeder insects	Waste liquid control; Drilling fluid; Concrete protection; Quenching	Anti-flood bag; Excreta collection	Wire and cable water blocking; Artificial snow; Hot/cold gel pack; Urine bag; Growing toys; Thickening agent; Fragrance carrier; Fire-retardant gel; Anti-fogging packing material; Waterbed

Some of the items listed above will be discussed in further detail in the next application sections. However, the table provided above is not comprehensive and does not contain all of the possible or potential applications for using sodium polyacrylate.

==== Sequestering agents ====
Sodium polyacrylate is commonly used in detergents as a chelating agent. A chelating agent is used in detergents because it has the ability to neutralize heavy metals that can be found in dirt, water, and other substances that could be in clothes. The addition of sodium polyacrylate makes detergent more effective when cleaning clothes.

==== Thickening agents ====
Since sodium polyacrylate can absorb and retain water molecules, it is used often in diapers, hair gels, and soaps. Sodium polyacrylate is considered a thickening agent because it increases the viscosity of water-based compounds. In diapers, sodium polyacrylate absorbs water found in urine in order to increase the capacity to store liquid and to reduce rashes.

==== Coatings ====
Sodium polyacrylate can also be utilized as a coating for electrical wires in order to reduce the amount of moisture around wires. Water and moisture near wires can cause issues with transmitting electrical signals. This could cause potential fire hazards. Due to the effective absorption and swelling capacity of sodium polyacrylate, it can absorb water and prevent it from surrounding or infiltrating wires.

==== Agriculture ====
In the agricultural industry, sodium polyacrylate is used to help plants retain moisture in the soil. It can act as a water reservoir for plants and is commonly used by florists to keep flowers fresh. Furthermore, the use of sodium polyacrylate for growing domestic fruit and vegetables has been approved by the U.S. Department of Agriculture.

=== Petroleum industry ===
Sodium polyacrylate is used as a fluid for drilling in petroleum industry.

=== Metalworking ===
It's reportedly used as organic polymer quenching agent, along with polyalkylene glycol (PAG), polyvinyl pyrrolidone (PVP), polyethyl oxazoline (PEO).

=== Environmental applications ===
==== Inhibition of hydrogen production from waste-diaper material ====
Although sodium polyacrylate has beneficial environmental applications, in one study, sodium polyacrylate was found to have inhibitory effects on the bioH2 fermentation of cellulosic wastes. Sodium polyacrylate is commonly used in diapers to absorb liquids from urine and feces, but it has been found that waste disposable diapers (WDD) accumulate in landfills since sodium polyacrylate prevents and negatively affects H2 production from the dark fermentation of WDD. To be specific, WDD represents 7% of urban solid refuse and the current option is landfilling, which is degradable only during biological conditions. Such conditions include anaerobic degradation and composting. Considering the high amounts of cellulosic waste in WDD, in order to be more sustainable it has been recommended that sodium polyacrylate be replaced with special starches that can absorb significant amounts of water yet are still degradable by dark fermentation (DF). Overall, despite having many beneficial environmental applications, the usage of sodium polyacrylate in diapers can prevent waste from degrading properly over time.

==== Low-salt animal skin preservation ====
In the leather industry, salt-based preservation is typically used because it is versatile, cost-effective, and readily available. However, the salt removed from the soaking process can cause pollution including elevated total dissolved solids (TDS). A study was conducted to measure the effectiveness of instead using a low-salt skin preservation method with sodium polyacrylate which has a reduced amount of NaCl. The main goal was to retain the properties of commercial leather while reducing pollution. The results showed that sodium polyacrylate with low salt levels had an adequate curing efficiency with a significant reduction (>65%) of TDS. Around 40% NaCl is used in conventional curing processes but the process conducted with sodium polyacrylate used 15% NaCl and 5% sodium polyacrylate.

==== Removal of metal ions from the environment ====
Studies have shown that sodium polyacrylate and other super-absorbent polymers or SAPs can be used to absorb and recover metal ions. Heavy metals are very harmful pollutants and can have detrimental effects on aquatic environments and human beings because of high toxicity, bioaccumulation, and non-degradability. Activities like mining and petroleum refining can produce these heavy metals which necessitates a simple and environmentally sustainable process to absorb these harmful metals to prevent disastrous results. Sodium polyacrylate can absorb solutions quickly by swelling porous structure networks to reduce mass-transfer resistance. Also, sodium polyacrylate is a low-cost, non-toxic, and biocompatible option for water purification to recover metal ions.

A study demonstrated that a sodium polyacrylate composite had high adsorption and desorption efficiency, implying that sodium polyacrylate can be recycled and reused as an effective absorbent for Cu(II) recovery. Sodium polyacrylate is able to do this because of its function group (-COO-) in its matrix which contributes to its effective adsorption capacity. Sodium polyacrylate has a very high adsorption capacity and one of the highest adsorption capacities for sodium polyacrylate was found with Cu(II) ions. Using a mild concentration of 0.01 M nitric acid, almost all of the copper could be recovered from the sodium polyacrylate matrix. The results of the study indicate the effectiveness of using sodium polyacrylate to rid the environment of toxic metals like copper. It is also a sustainable solution since sodium polyacrylate can be recycled and reused, therefore, reducing waste.

=== Drug delivery applications ===
Sodium polyacrylate can be used for microencapsulation to deliver substances like probiotics. The delivery of probiotics to the digestive system can be difficult because the viability of probiotics decreases sharply throughout the gastrointestinal tract due to strong acid conditions. Although alginate (Alg) is the most extensively used native microcapsule matrix, combining Alg with sodium polyacrylate yields better results based on research comparing different encapsulation methods. Sodium polyacrylate is an oral safe food additive approved by the Food and Drug Administration (FDA) and has repeated carboxylate groups along its molecular chain. As a result, the acid buffering effect of sodium polyacrylate could be better than small molecular acid. Also, the binding capacity of sodium polyacrylate with calcium ions could be higher than Alg because of the high concentration of carboxylate groups and the increased flexible nature of the polymer chain.

Sodium polyacrylate has been found useful in drug delivery applications. When combined with Alg, sodium polyacrylate was able to successfully encapsulate Lactobacillus plantarum MA2 and allowed better probiotic delivery compared to an Alg microcapsule. This result is true for both the small and large intestine. This research has shown that Alg-PAAS(1:2) could be a potentially effective microcapsule matrix in probiotic drug delivery. This capsule enhanced the survival of the probiotic when traveling both in vitro and in vivo.

=== Entertainment ===
Hydrogel beads made of sodium polyacrylate are used as expandable water toys, and as ammunition for gel blaster toy guns. It is also a key component of the gel used for nuru massage.

== Safety ==
Sodium polyacrylate itself does not irritate the skin. It is made up of large polymers that do not have the ability to infiltrate the skin. However, sometimes sodium polyacrylate is mixed with acrylic acid which is leftover from the manufacturing process. As a leftover of producing sodium polyacrylate, acrylic acid can cause a rash in contact with skin. It should be less than 300 PPM as the absorbent material in paper diapers. Also, if sodium polyacrylate is being used in a powder form it should not be inhaled. If spilled in an area with water, sodium polyacrylate could cause the ground to be very slippery. Finally, sodium polyacrylate can cause severe clogging if it enters sewers or drainage systems in large quantities. Otherwise, sodium polyacrylate is non-toxic and safe from any major risks. The data on its safety on environment is not adequate, however it is considered non-biodegradable and may cause salinization of soil when added in large quantities.
