= Bioadhesives inspired by gastropods =

Bioadhesives inspired by gastropods are biomimetic adhesive materials modeled on the mucus of gastropods such as snails and slugs. Gastropod mucus is a viscoelastic secretion containing glycoproteins, glycosaminoglycans, enzymes, and metal ions, and can adhere to wet surfaces. Gastropod-inspired adhesives reproduce aspects of this adhesion through chemical bonding, mechanical interlocking, electrostatic interactions, and cross-linking. Energy-dissipating polymer networks can contribute to their mechanical strength and toughness.

Research on gastropod-inspired bioadhesives has focused particularly on biomedical applications, including wound closure, tissue sealing, drug delivery, dental applications, and the attachment of medical devices. Experimental systems include hydrogel adhesives designed to maintain adhesion to wet and moving biological tissues, and some have also been studied for antimicrobial activity and biocompatibility.

== Gastropod mucus ==
Mucus is the viscoelastic, biological secretions from gastropods like snails and slugs. Gastropod mucus serves as a lubricant and survival mechanism, facilitating movement on wet surfaces and preventing dehydration. These functions are attributed to the unique cross-linking and electrostatic interactions as well as the combination of glycoproteins, amino acids, and divalent metal ions, gastropod mucus, that allow it to adhere to surfaces even in wet environments.

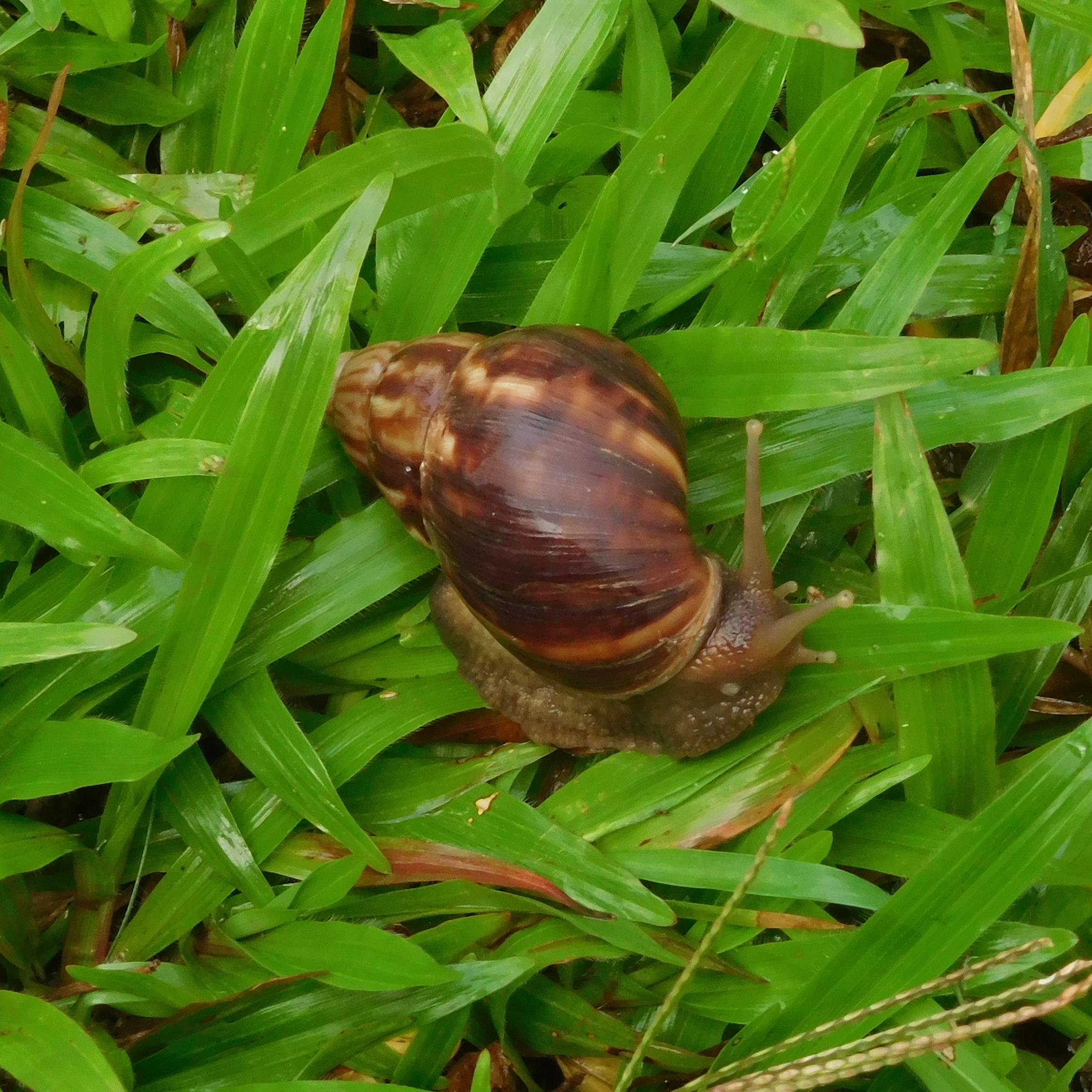
Achatina fulica

The adhesive strength from gastropod mucus has attracted scientific interest. The adhesive mucus is capable of bonding to wet surfaces chemically and physically by intertwining proteins and electrostatic attraction due to positively charged amines. Studies have also been conducted to discover antimicrobial properties in the glycoproteins in the mucus of certain snails like the Achatina fulica, or otherwise known as the African giant snail.

Researchers look to the adhesive gastropod mucus to develop biomimetic hydrogels that can be used to heal incision wounds and as self-adhering micro-encapsulated drug carriers with antimicrobial properties.

== History ==
The use of snail slime in cosmetics and pharmaceutical applications dates back to ancient Greece, where it was recommended as a treatment for skin inflammation. Early practices involved crushing secretions from brown garden snails to help alleviate inflammatory skin conditions. This approach is part of a broader tradition known as zootherapy, which has existed since ancient Mesopotamia and Egypt and involves the use of animal-based remedies for healing. Additionally, snails were known to be high in nutrients and as a delicacy to be eaten.

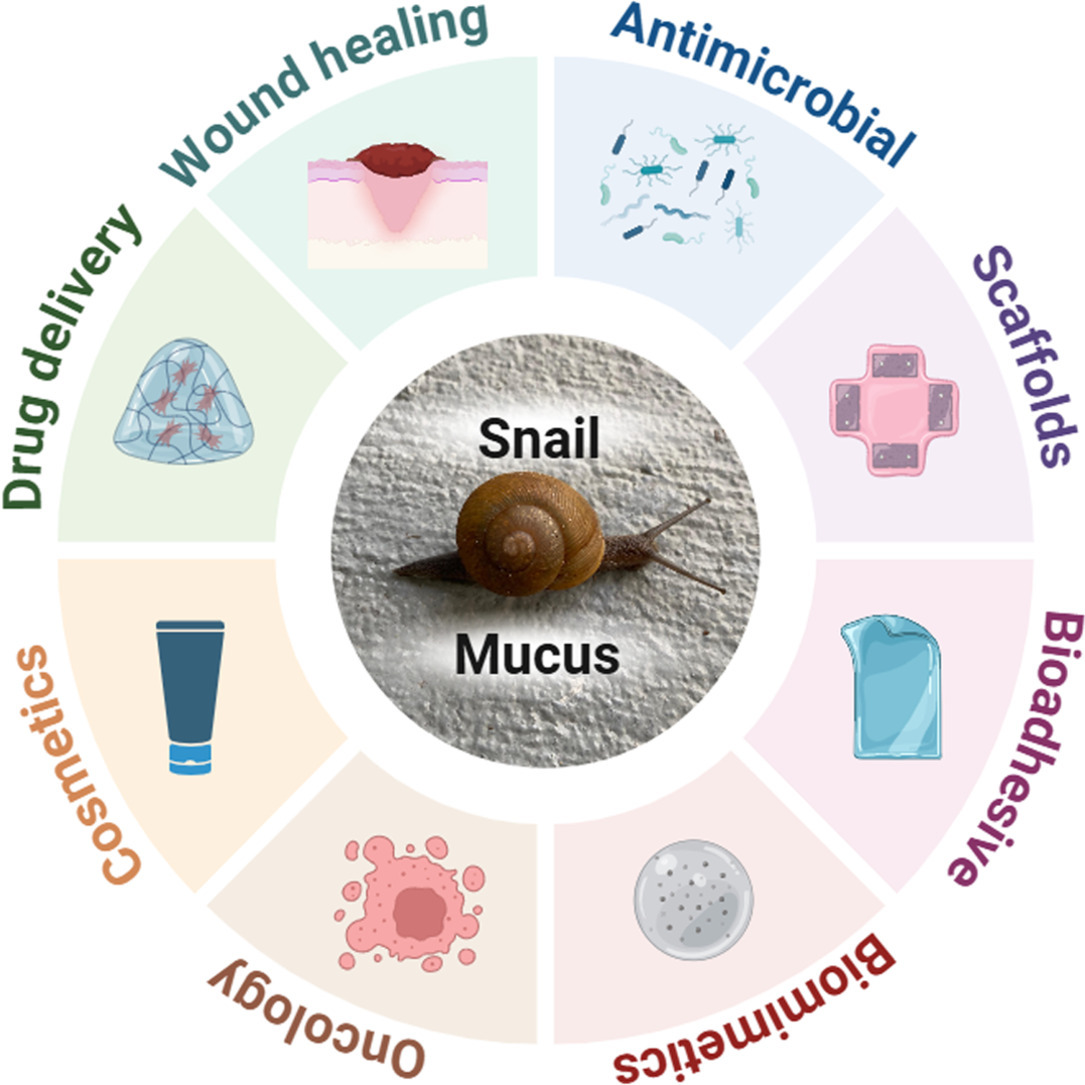
A figure explaining the medical uses of snail mucus.

Today, scientific interest in snail and slug mucus has grown due to its potential biomedical and cosmetic applications. In the present day, slug slime is being studied for its antimicrobial properties and healing properties with research being done on drug delivery systems as well as cancer therapy. Scientific interest in snail and slug mucus has also grown in recent decades, particularly after glycosaminoglycans (GAGs), important compounds for skin health and repair, were first extracted from the African giant snail, Achatina fulica in 1996.

== Chemical composition ==
Allantoin

=== Biological slug mucus ===
Mucus from gastropods is composed of a combination of water and glycoproteins, enzymes, and trace amounts of metal ions. Mucin glycoproteins, like achacin and glycosaminoglycans (GAGs) like hyaluronic acid are the primary components of mucus, contributing to its antimicrobial properties. Amino groups interact with the sulfate and carboxyl groups found in the glycosaminoglycans to promote bonding and hydrophobic interactions during gel formations. Other molecules like allantoin, or 5-ureidohyantoin, can be found in slug mucus to prompt cell proliferation and wound healing, as well as collagen synthesis, respectively. Significant amounts of zinc, iron, copper, and manganese metal ions are typically found in the chemical composition of slug mucus.

== Biomechanics ==
=== Bioadhesive formation ===
==== Double-network hydrogel structure ====
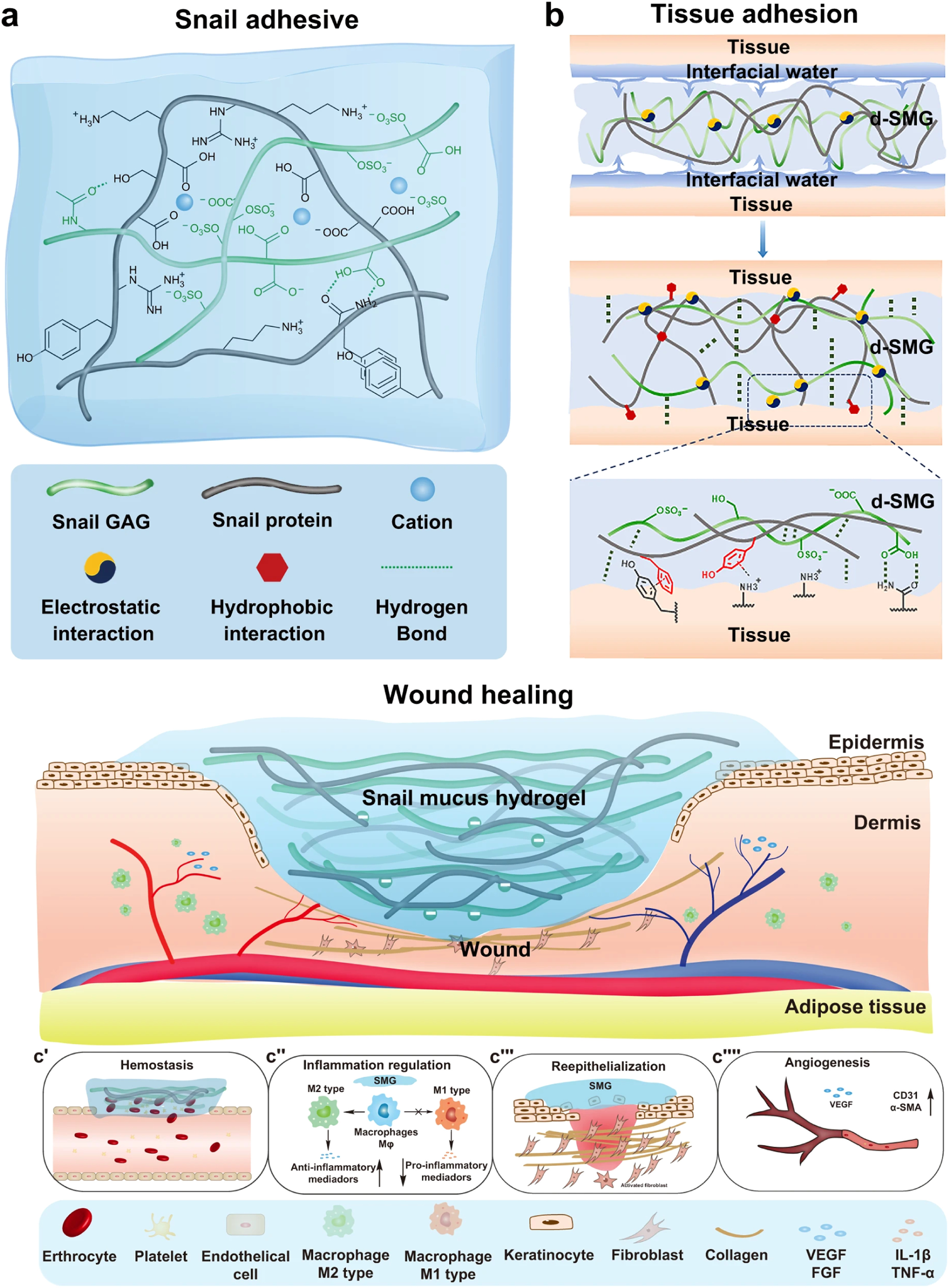
Schematic of double-network hydrogel adhesion

The adhesion of slug slime derived and inspired bioadhesives is achieved through four primary mechanisms: chemical bonding, mechanical interlocking, electrostatic interaction and crosslinking reactions. Slug/snail bioinspired hydrogel adhesive can be formed by covalently crosslinking snail polyanionic glycosaminoglycan and positively charged methacrylated gelatin polymers. Under UV exposure the combination of these two compounds undergoes gelation and solidifies. Proteins in the mucus create super molecular entanglement by creating a 3D network that interacts with the linear polysaccharides in the mucus. This entanglement is fortifies by electrostatic forces of attraction between positively charges amino groups in the protein and negatively charged sulfate and carboxyl groups in the polysaccharides. Hydrogen bonding also contributes to the formation of the hydrogel structure do to the presence of hydroxyl groups, aromatic and aliphatic amino acid in the mucus.

==== Mechanical interlocking ====
The bioadhesives have the ability to diffuse and penetrate the pores and irregularities in the surface it is adhered to which forms a close interlock. This increases the contact area of the too surfaces and results in an increase in adhesive force.

In bioinspired adhesive systems the application of Chitosan, was used as a bridging polymer in a 3D hydrogel network to perform topological wet adhesion. By creating strong physical bonds between synthetic materials, by creating non covalent bonds between H bonds. It was shown that Chitosan causes rapid cohesion 1000 J·m⁻² by 3 and 2000 J·m⁻² by 10 min. Chitosan diffuses and soaks which causes chitosan to move into the polyacrylamide mesh and weave themselves through. Chitosan penetrates deep as ~ 25 μm in tendon and skin after 10 min and 1h of compression respectively.

==== Electrostatic interactions ====
The glycosaminoglycan in the bioadhesive is hydrophilic in nature due to the presence sulfate, carboxyl and hydroxyl groups. When it is applied to wet surfaces such as bodily tissues, it absorbs interface water which allows for the formation of hydrogen bonds which creates tissue adhesion. Without this, water at the interface would block the hydrogen bond receptors.

==== Crosslinking reactions ====
The Arion subfuscus mucus protein matrix contains heavily oxidized protein and thus, carries a substantial number of carbonyl groups that form cross-links and serve as the primary backbone of the gel. Direct metal-based cross-links formed by trace amounts of zinc and divalent ions like calcium and magnesium contribute to stabilizing the gel.

The adhesive force derived by this protein matrix can be increased by the presence of metal ions in the bioadhesive. Copper and zinc treated Arion subfuscus mucus protein bioadhesives has shown evidence of increase in adhesion energy over the course of 72 hours due to a slower rate of loss of protein and carbohydrate components. To determine the adhesion energy (w), researchers used the following formula, taking the integral of the adhesive stress (σ) vs. strain (ε) curve and then multiplying it by the sample thickness (d).

$w = d\int \sigma d\epsilon$

=== Mechanical behavior ===
The mucus of the gastropods contained positively charge polypeptides and negatively charged polysaccharides that form a dissipative matrix. This contributes to the mechanical strength and toughness of the hydrogel. Tensile strength of dried snail mucus gel of the Achatina fulica species reached 82.59 ± 7.39 kPa.

In addition to tensile properties, gastropod adhesives have significant pel strength. This high peel resistance is due to the double interpenetrating network structure, where the deformable network dissipates energy whole the stiffer network maintains structural integrity. As a result, the adhesive can sustain large deformations and distribute stress over a larger area. The combination of energy dissipation and strong interfacial bonding allows the adhesive to adhere to wet and irregular biological surfaces.

== Applications ==
The properties of these gastropod inspired adhesives allow for various applications ranging from topical use to the adhesion of medical devices due to their ability to stick well in wet environments and their biocompatibility. In terms of wound healing, DBHA was shown in animal studies to improve healing compared to commonly used biogels such as Tisseel, BioGlue, Histoacryl, Dermabond, Surgiseal, Coseal, and DuraSeal. Similarly, gastropod mucus extracts have been found to accelerate the healing of second degree burns in mice likely due to their antimicrobial, anti inflammatory, and antioxidant properties. These mucus extracts also show strong antibacterial effects against gram positive and gram negative bacteria due to their peptides. Aside from external use, these adhesives have also been tested for internal medical uses. For example, they were used as sealants in porcine hearts and were able to successfully prevent leakage even at strains up to 100%. They are also capable of sticking to moving tissue as shown when an actuator was successfully attached to myocardium surfaces. Because they work so well in wet conditions, they have potential for dental applications where moisture will always be present. There are various other possible applications in which these gastropod inspired adhesives can be used such as oncology by inhibiting the growth of melanoma cancer cells and drug delivery by protecting the drug and extending its half life.

=== Dual inspired bioadhesives ===
By combining the catechol chemistry in marine mussels which is responsible for their ability to form strong wet adhesions, and the dissipative matrix found in the mucus of land slugs a dual bio inspired hydrogel adhesive was created. A double-bioinspired hydrogel adhesive (DBHA) thus consists of an intertwined catechol modified peptide dendrimer (G3KPC) with an anionic carboxymethyl cellulose and cationic chitosan (CC), network through covalent and noncovalent cross-linkages. This hydrogel has self healing abbilities due to the nature of the schiff base reaction, Micheal addition, and multiple noncovalent cross linkages in the gel, which allows them to re-cross link together with ease.

==== Mechanical properties ====
DBHA exhibits shear thinning behaviour and at low strains, storage and loss moduli are independent of strain but past a critical strain, the hydrogel yields and is transformed from a solid to a liquid.

==== Clinical trials ====
In terms of antimicrobial performance, studies report that the peptides found in DBHA can selectively kill microorganisms without significant toxicity to host cells. This is attributed to the presence of free protonated amines in G3KPCA, which interact with and disrupt negatively charged bacterial membranes, contributing to bactericidal activity. In vitro compatibility tests using mouse NIH-3T3 fibroblasts showed that DBHA is non-cytotoxic under the tested condition.

DBHA has also been tested in more realistic conditions, including bleeding environments. When applied to porcine skin covered in blood, only minor differences were observed between wet and dry adhesion performance. It was also tested on tissues such as the stomach, heart, artery, and liver, where adhesion forces were measured. In rat incision models, DBHA was used in wound closure studies where closure was observed after seven days, in comparison to conventional sutures and commercial adhesives. Additional testing showed that after 24 hours in an adhesive conditioned medium, human dermal fibroblasts remained viable, indicating biocompatibility.

== Clinical trials ==
Clinical and experimental studies on gastropod inspired adhesives report results across a range of applications such as skin treatment and wound healing. In one human study using Cornu aspersum slime, 27 participants were divided into four groups based on age and gender. The Cornu Aspersum Muller slime and a commercial slime were applied to opposite sides of the face once daily for 15 days. Female participants applied the slime at the corners of their eyes, while male participants applied it to the forehead. The results indicated that some women experienced increased skin firmness when using Cornu aspersum, with more noticeable effects in participants under forty years old compared to those above that age. For male participants, the results were less statistically significant overall.

This was also supported by subcutaneous implantation and myocardium attachment studies in rats. One finding was that the gastropod-inspired adhesive produced a lower inflammatory response compared to some existing adhesive methods under the tested conditions. Overall, these findings highlight observed differences between gastropod inspired adhesives and traditional wound dressings and adhesives, which have been reported to exhibit reduced adhesion in wet conditions.
