= Fene (disambiguation) =

Fene may also refer to:

- Fene, Galicia— a municipality in the province of A Coruña, in the autonomous community of Galicia, in northwestern Spain
- FENE model, the finitely extensible nonlinear elastic model of a long-chained polymer
- Fene, the Hungarian demon of illness
