= Solution polymerization =

Method of industrial polymerization

Solution polymerization is a method of industrial polymerization. In this procedure, a monomer is dissolved in a non-reactive solvent that contains a catalyst or initiator.

The reaction results in a polymer which is also soluble in the chosen solvent. Heat released by the reaction is absorbed by the solvent, reducing the reaction rate. Moreover, the viscosity of the reaction mixture is reduced, preventing autoacceleration at high monomer concentrations. A decrease in viscosity of the reaction mixture by dilution also aids heat transfer, one of the major issues connected with polymer production, since most polymerizations are exothermic reactions. Once the desired conversion is reached, excess solvent must be removed to obtain the pure polymer. Accordingly, solution polymerization is primarily used in applications where the presence of a solvent is desired anyway, as is the case for varnish and adhesives. Another application of polymer solutions includes the manufacture of fibers by wet or dry spinning or plastic films.

Disadvantages of solution polymerization are decrease of monomer and initiator concentration leading to reduction of reaction rate, lower volume utilization of reactor, additional cost of the process related to solvent recycling, toxicity and other environmental impacts of most of organic solvents. One of the major disadvantages of the solution polymerization technique is that however inert the selected solvent may be, chain transfer to the solvent cannot be completely ruled out and, hence, it is difficult to get very high molecular weight product. From common solvents, especially chlorinated hydrocarbons are susceptible to chain transfer in radical polymerization. Intensity of chain transfer for different compounds may be quantified by use of chain transfer constants and the decrease of degree of polymerization may be calculated using Mayo equation.

== Industrially important polymers produced by solution polymerization ==
Polyacrylonitrile (PAN) is manufactured by radical polymerization in dimethylformamide (DMF), dimethyl sulfoxide (DMSO), organic carbonates, sulfuric acid, nitric acid or water solutions of inorganic salts and converted to fibers.

Polyacrylic acid (PAA) and polyacrylamide are obtained by radical polymerization in water solution and used as thickeners, adhesives or flocculants.

Acrylate and methacrylate homo- and copolymers are made by radical polymerization in toluene-acetone for coating applications.

Polyethylene (HDPE, LLDPE) - some grades are made by coordination polymerization in high boiling hydrocarbone solvents (above PE solution temperature). The advantage of this process is very high propagation rate allowing fast changes of product grades.

High cis polybutadiene (BR) is manufactured by coordination polymerization in hydrocarbons.

Solution styrene-butadiene rubber (sSBR) is produced by anionic polymerization in hydrocarbons leading to rubber with better properties for making tires than emulsion polymerization type.

Polyvinyl acetate used further for polyvinyl alcohol is manufactured by radical polymerization in methanol solution.

Liquid polybutadienes are made by anionic or radical polymerization in hydrocarbon solutions.

Butyl rubber (IIR) by low temperature cationic copolymerization of isobutylene with isoprene in ethylene or methylchloride solution.

Aromatic polyamides (e.g. Kevlar and Nomex) are made by polycondensation in N-methyl-pyrrolidone and calcium chloride solution.

This process is one of two used in the production of sodium polyacrylate, a superabsorbent polymer used in disposable diapers.

== See also ==
- Dispersion polymerization
- Emulsion dispersion
- Superabsorbent polymer
