= Bulk polymerization =

Chemical process

Bulk polymerization or mass polymerization is carried out by adding a soluble radical initiator to pure monomer in liquid state. The initiator should dissolve in the monomer. The reaction is initiated by heating or exposing to radiation. As the reaction proceeds the mixture becomes more viscous. The reaction is exothermic and a wide range of molecular masses are produced.

Bulk polymerization is carried out in the absence of any solvent or dispersant and is thus the simplest in terms of formulation. It is used for most step-growth polymers and many types of chain-growth polymers. In the case of chain-growth reactions, which are generally exothermic, the heat evolved may cause the reaction to become too vigorous and difficult to control unless efficient cooling is used.

== Advantages and disadvantages ==
Bulk polymerization has several advantages over other methods, these advantages are:

- The system is simple and requires thermal insulation.
- The polymer obtained is pure.
- Large castings may be prepared directly.
- Molecular weight distribution can be easily changed
- The product obtained has high optical clarity

Disadvantages:

- Heat transfer and mixing become difficult as the viscosity of reaction mass increases.
- The problem of heat transfer is compounded by the highly exothermic nature of free radical addition polymerization.
- The polymerization is obtained with a broad molecular weight distribution due to the high viscosity and lack of good heat transfer.
- very high molecular weights are obtained.
- Gel effect.

For reducing the disadvantages of bulk polymerization, the process can be carried out in a solution. This is known as solution polymerization.

== Classification ==
There are two main types of bulk polymerization:

=== Quiescent bulk polymerization ===
There is no agitation in this type of bulk polymerization. This is often used to synthesize cross-linked and thermosetting polymers. Due to dormant nature of the system, the Trommsdorff effect is significantly present, which in turn leads to longer chains and tougher material. The major disadvantages of this type of polymerization include entrapped bubbles (or voids) due to monomer boil-off and inability to convert all monomers.

=== Stirred bulk polymerization ===
Continuous stirring of the monomer happens in this type of polymerization. Very specific designs of reactors are used depending upon the viscosity of the polymer. In some applications, the completed polymer melt is transferred from the reactor using a gear pump or applying moderate external pressure. It differs from the solution polymerization in a way that the monomer itself acts as a solvent.
