= KPAM (disambiguation) =

KPAM is a talk radio station at 1640 AM in Oregon, United States.

KPAM may also refer to:

== Radio stations ==
- KPAM (860 AM), a radio station in Troutdale, Oregon, that operated from 1997 to 2026
- KBNP, a radio station at 1410 AM in Portland, Oregon, known in 1951–1973 and 1976–1982 as KPAM
- KYCH-FM, a radio station at 97.1 FM in Portland, Oregon, known in 1970–1980 as KPAM-FM

== Other uses ==
- Tyndall Air Force Base, a military facility near Panama City, Florida, ICAO code KPAM
- Korean People's Association in Manchuria, an autonomous prefecture (1929–1931)
- Kuwaiti-Polish Archaeological Mission, in Subiya, Kuwait
- KPAM, abbreviation for potassium polyacrylamide, a formulation of potassium polyacrylate
