= Potassium polyacrylate =

Names
- IUPAC name Poly(potassium prop-2-enoate)
- Other names Poly(acrylic acid), potassium salt

Identifiers
CAS Number	25608-12-2
ECHA InfoCard	100.118.160
EC Number	607-755-0
CompTox Dashboard (EPA)	DTXSID801011074

Properties
Chemical formula	(C_{3}H_{3}KO_{2})_{n}
Molar mass	Variable
- Except where otherwise noted, data are given for materials in their standard state (at 25 °C [77 °F], 100 kPa). Infobox references

Potassium polyacrylate is a potassium salt of polyacrylic acid with the chemical formula [−CH_{2}−CH(CO_{2}K)−]_{n}. As a type of superabsorbent polymer, it can absorb hundreds of times its original weight in purified water. Crosslinked potassium polyacrylate forms a hydrogel, a three-dimensional polymer network capable of absorbing and retaining substantial quantities of water.

Different from sodium polyacrylate, potassium polyacrylate contains potassium rather than sodium ions, and can be used as a water-retaining agent in agriculture. Its effectiveness in soil depends on factors including soil composition and salinity.

== Environmental and human hazards ==
Potassium polyacrylate may cause severe eye irritation, and should not be released into the environment. It is also slippery when wet.

== Uses ==
=== Water retaining agent ===
As a type of superabsorbent polymer for plants (Ag-SAP), potassium polyacrylate can increase moisture availability to plants.

As a soil conditioner to increase water retention in soil for plant hydration, when mixed with soil, the crosslinked polymer absorbs water and swells, subsequently releasing some of the retained water as the surrounding soil becomes drier. Research on superabsorbent polymer hydrogels has found that their incorporation into soils can increase water retention and reduce evaporation. However, their effects on other soil properties, including infiltration and hydraulic conductivity, vary depending on the polymer formulation and soil characteristics. A 2022 study published in Scientia Agricola evaluated a commercial hydrogel composed of potassium acrylate, acrylamide, and a mineral component under different levels of irrigation water salinity. Increasing salinity reduced the hydrogel's water absorption by 84%, reducing water losses from sandy soil, but its application did not improve initial development of maize under saline irrigation conditions, instead leading to reduced plant biomass at the tested application rate. Potassium polyacrylate has been used or proposed for applications including seed coating, growing seedlings, planting crops, topdressing crops, planting and transplanting trees, and flower transport.

=== Drilling fluids ===
Potassium-containing polyacrylate and polyacrylamide polymers are also used in drilling fluids, for which potassium polyacrylamide, as a formulation, is commonly abbreviated "KPAM". It is employed as a shale-inhibiting polymer and viscosity modifier in water-based drilling fluids, helping stabilize borehole walls. Technical sources use KPAM to designate both potassium polyacrylamide and potassium polyacrylate. For example, a United States patent concerning drilling fluids identifies KPAM as potassium polyacrylate, distinguishing it from a separately-listed polyacrylamide (PAM). Potassium polyacrylate and polyacrylamide are chemically related but distinct polymers. Potassium acrylate–acrylamide copolymers, which incorporate both types of constituent units, have also been investigated for their water-retaining properties.

== Mechanism ==
Potassium polyacrylate works similarly to a sponge under the soil surface. It is composed of a set of hydrophilic polymeric chains, which link together chemically to become a water-insoluble matrix that attracts and holds water molecules. The immense size and weight of its molecular structure allows each potassium polyacrylate granule to absorb purified water over 500 times its dry weight. Water absorption is generally greater in purified water than in solutions containing dissolved salts. The presence of salts can reduce swelling, particularly where dissolved ions interact with the charged groups of the polymer. Researchers have investigated modifications to potassium polyacrylate hydrogels intended to improve their water absorption in saline conditions. The amount absorbed depends on the degree of crosslinking and the composition of the water, with absorption generally decreasing in the presence of dissolved salts.

The polyacrylate structure does not bind water irreversibly, allowing some of the retained moisture to become available to plant roots as the surrounding soil dries. However, the amount of water released depends on the properties of the polymer and the soil, and its effects on soil drainage and aeration can vary. Potassium polyacrylate can also absorb water containing dissolved soil nutrients, water-soluble fertilizers, and other chemicals. By increasing water retention in the plant root zone, it may reduce plant water stress and improve germination. However, these benefits are not universal, and the effectiveness of superabsorbent polymers depends on a wide variety of factors.

As a soil amendment, potassium polyacrylate can improve soil water-holding capacity.
