= Enzymatic polymerization =

Possible alternative polymerization process

Enzymatic polymerization is a potential area in polymer research, providing a sustainable and adaptable alternative to conventional polymerization processes. Its capacity to manufacture polymers with exact structures in mild circumstances opens up new possibilities for material design and application, helping to progress both research and industry. It is a novel and sustainable method of synthesizing polymers that utilizes the catalytic properties of enzymes to both initiate and regulate the polymerization process. It works under mild circumstances, usually at room temperature and pressure as well as in aqueous environments, in contrast to conventional chemical polymerization techniques that frequently need for harsh conditions and harmful reagents. This approach allows fine control over the structure and functionality of polymers while simultaneously consuming less energy and having a less environmental impact.

This polymerization technique has the advantage of being compatible with renewable resources. Many of the monomers utilized in these procedures come from natural sources, which aligns with the ideas of green chemistry and sustainability. This alignment is important given growing environmental concerns and the quest for more sustainable industrial operations. The potential applications of polymers produced via enzymatic polymerization includes the fields of biomedicine, materials science, and environmental engineering. For example, biodegradable polymers produced using this method are useful for medical applications such as drug delivery systems, biosensors and tissue engineering scaffolds. Furthermore, enzymatic polymerization opens up fascinating possibilities for the production of innovative biomaterials with tailored characteristics for specific industrial applications.

== Mechanism of enzymatic polymerization ==
Mechanism of enzyme catalyzed reaction.

Enzymatic polymerization can happen in a variety of ways, including:

Condensation Polymerization: Enzymes such as lipases and proteases catalyze the step-growth polymerization of monomers by establishing ester, amide, or peptide bonds, releasing tiny molecules such as water or alcohol as waste.

Addition Polymerization: This method includes radical-mediated processes, in which enzymes such as peroxidases initiate polymerization by producing radical species that propagate the polymer chain.

Ring-Opening Polymerization: Enzymes help to open cyclic monomers to produce linear polymers, which is a typical process for synthesizing polyesters and polyamides.

== Types of enzymes used in polymerization ==
Polymerases, or polymerase enzymes, can catalyze the synthesis of different kinds of polymers. Key enzymes involved include: Lipases are used in the synthesis of polyesters and polyamides, lipases accelerate esterification and transesterification processes, which are required for polymer chain formation. In oxidative polymerization, peroxidases aid in the polymerization of phenolic and aniline derivatives, resulting in the production of conductive polymers. Glycosyltransferases are necessary for polysaccharide formation because they catalyze the transfer of sugar moieties to create glycosidic linkages. Proteases are enzymes that help create peptide bonds, allowing amino acid monomers to be polymerized into polyamides or proteins.
