= Swelling capacity =

Amount of a liquid that can be absorbed by a polymer

The swelling capacity of a polymer is the amount of a liquid that can be absorbed by it. This test can done by two methods:

1. Beaker test method
2. Tea bag test method

== Beaker test method ==
In this method

- A small amount of superabsorbent polymer material is taken (0.1g) and it is placed in the beaker.
- 100 ml of deionized water is poured into the beaker.
- After 20 min the swollen polymer was separated by using filter paper
- By weighing the polymer, one can find the swollen capacity of the SAP material.

== Tea bag test method ==
- In this method, 0.1 g of SAP material is placed into a permeable bag, which is suspended over excess water in a beaker.
- Wait 20 min. and weigh the bag and then calculate the percentage of swelling through the following formula:
  (w2-w1)/(w1) %
  w1= weight of the polymer (Before swelling)
  w2= weight of the polymer (After swelling)
- Note: Filter paper only for removing water.

== Schroeder's paradox ==
Some polymers exhibit larger experimentally measured swelling capacity when immersed in pure liquid compared to testing with saturated vapor. This phenomenon is known as the Schroeder's paradox.
