= Toms effect =

Property of complex fluids

In fluid dynamics, the Toms effect is a reduction of the drag of a turbulent flow through a pipeline when polymer solutions are added.

In 1948, B. A. Toms discovered by experiments that the addition of a small amount of polymer into a Newtonian solvent (parts per million by weight), which results in a non-Newtonian fluid solution, can reduce the skin frictional drag on a stationary surface by up to 80% when turbulence is present.

This technology has been successfully implemented to reduce pumping cost for oil pipelines, to increase the flow rate in fire fighting equipment and to help irrigation and drainage. It also has potential applications in the design of ship and submarine hulls to achieve an increased speed and reduced energy cost.

== See also ==
- Drag reducing agent
- FENE model
- Non-Newtonian fluid
- Direct numerical simulation
