= Suspension polymerization =

Polymerization reaction among monomers suspended in a liquid

IUPAC definition

Polymerization in which polymer is formed in monomer, or monomer-solvent droplets
in a continuous phase that is a nonsolvent for both the monomer and the formed polymer.

Note 1: In suspension polymerization, the initiator is located mainly in the monomer phase.

Note 2: Monomer or monomer-solvent droplets in suspension polymerization have
diameters usually exceeding 10 μm.

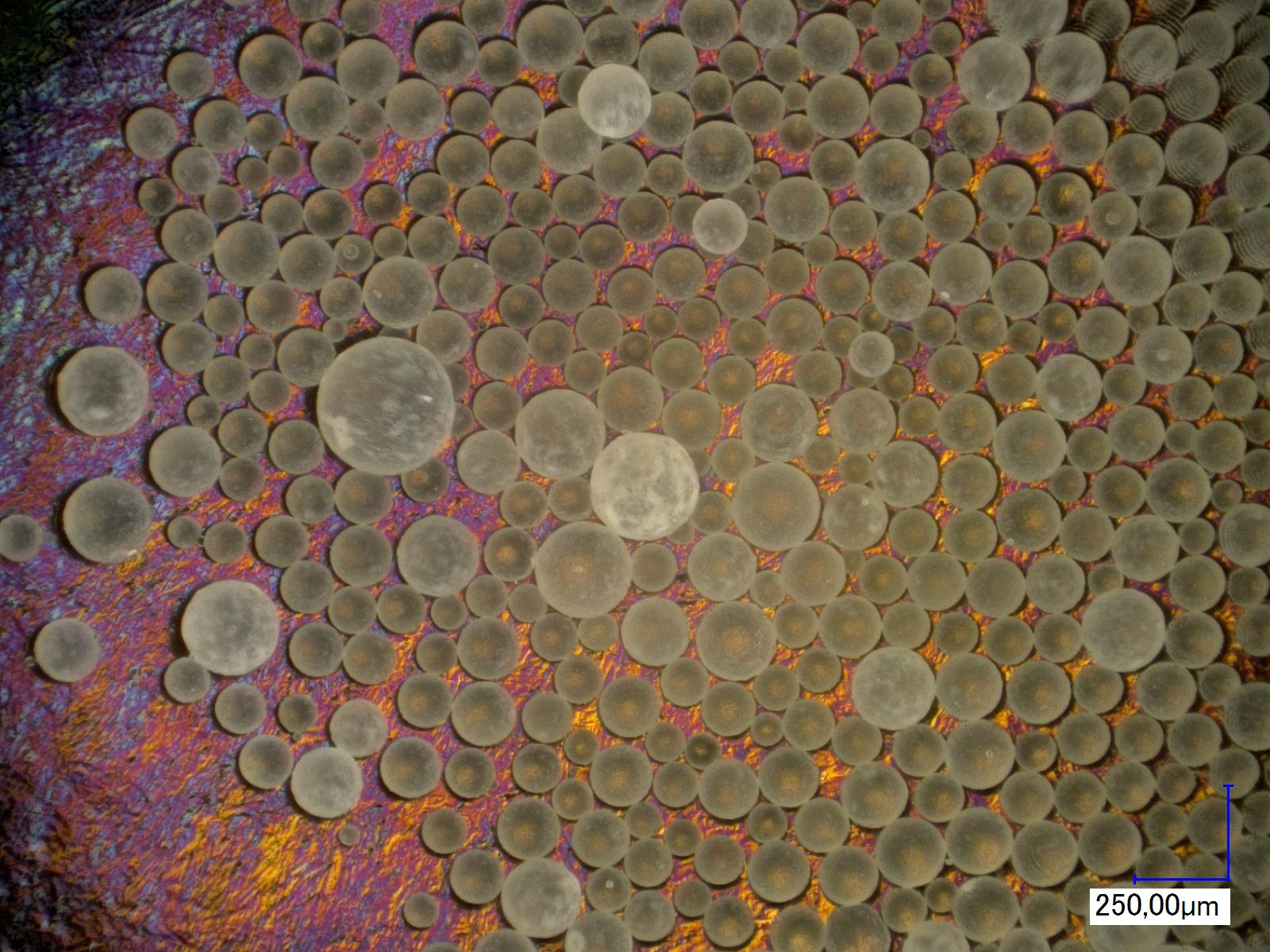
Light microscopic picture of a PMMA-copolymer, made by suspension polymerization

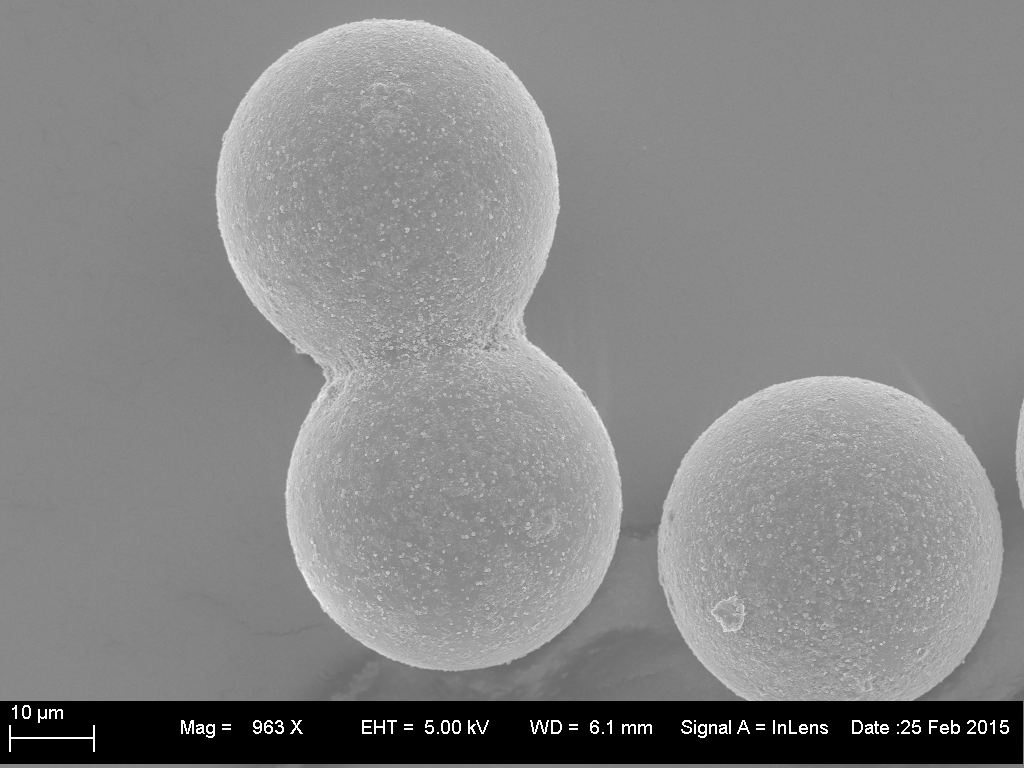
SEM-Picture of PMMA-particles, that started to coalesce during suspension polymerization, close to a single bead

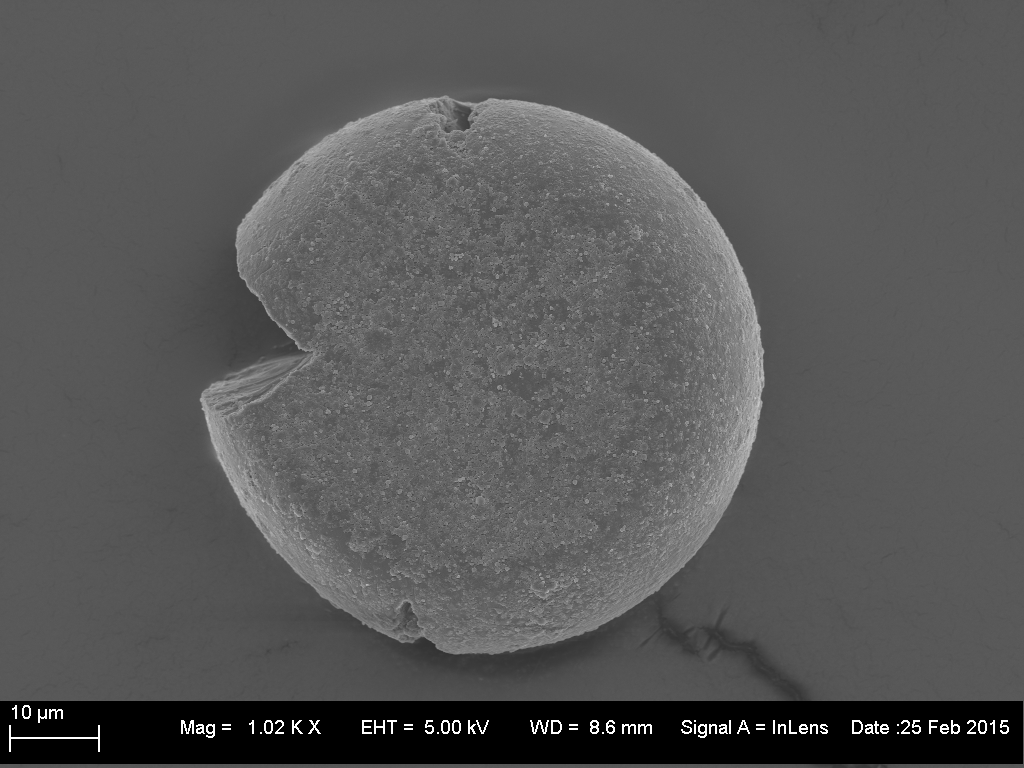
SEM-picture of a Pac-Man shaped PMMA-copolymer particle, made by suspension polymerization

In polymer chemistry, suspension polymerization is a heterogeneous radical polymerization process that uses mechanical agitation to mix a monomer or mixture of monomers in a liquid phase, such as water, while the monomers polymerize, forming spheres of polymer. The monomer droplets (size of the order 10-1000 μm) are suspended in the liquid phase. The individual monomer droplets can be considered as undergoing bulk polymerization. The liquid phase outside these droplets help in better conduction of heat and thus tempering the increase in temperature.

While choosing a liquid phase for suspension polymerization, low viscosity, high thermal conductivity and low-temperature variation of viscosity are generally preferred. The primary advantage of suspension polymerization over other types of polymerization is that a higher degree of polymerization can be achieved without monomer boil-off. During this process, there is often a possibility of these monomer droplets sticking to each other and causing creaming in the solution. To prevent this, the mixture is carefully stirred or a protective colloid is often added. One of the most common suspending agents is polyvinyl alcohol (PVA). Usually, the monomer conversion is completed unlike in bulk polymerization, and the initiator used in this is monomer-soluble.

This process is used in the production of many commercial resins, including polyvinyl chloride (PVC), a widely used plastic, styrene resins including polystyrene, expanded polystyrene, and high-impact polystyrene, as well as poly(styrene-acrylonitrile) and poly(methyl methacrylate).

== Particle properties ==
Suspension polymerization is divided into two main types, depending on the morphology of the particles that result. In bead polymerization, the polymer is soluble in its monomer and the result is a smooth, translucent bead. In powder polymerization, the polymer is not soluble in its monomer and the resultant bead will be porous and irregular. The morphology of the polymer can be changed by adding a monomer diluent, an inert liquid that is insoluble with the liquid matrix. The diluent changes the solubility of the polymer in the monomer and gives a measure of control over the porosity of the resulting polymer.

The polymer beads that result can range in size from 100 nm to 5 mm. The size is controlled by the stirring speed, the volume fraction of monomer, the concentration and identity of the stabilizers used, and the viscosities of the different components. The following equation derived empirically summarizes some of these interactions:

$$\bar{d} = k{D_v \cdot R \cdot \nu_m \cdot \epsilon \over D_s \cdot N \cdot \nu_l \cdot C_s}$$

d is the average particle size, k includes parameters related to the reaction vessel design, D_{v} is the reaction vessel diameter, D_{s} is the diameter of the stirrer, R is the volume ratio of the monomer to the liquid matrix, N is the stirring speed, ν_{m} and ν_{l} are the viscosity of the monomer phase and liquid matrix respectively, ε is the interfacial tension of the two phases, and C_{s} is the concentration of stabilizer. The most common way to control the particle size is to change the stirring speed.

== See also ==
- Dispersion polymerization
- Radical polymerization
- Polymer
- Polymerization
- Step-growth polymerization
- Emulsion polymerization
- Superabsorbent polymer
