= Autoacceleration =

Runaway polymerization reaction

Course of a redox-initiated methyl methacrylate substance polymerization with clearly visible Trommsdorff-Norrish-effect / autoacceleration

In polymer chemistry, autoacceleration (gel effect) is a dangerous reaction behavior that can occur in free-radical polymerization systems. It is due to the localized increases in viscosity of the polymerizing system that slow termination reactions. The removal of reaction obstacles therefore causes a rapid increase in the overall rate of reaction, leading to possible reaction runaway and altering the characteristics of the polymers produced. It is also known as the Trommsdorff–Norrish effect after German chemist Ernst Trommsdorff and British chemist Ronald G.W. Norrish.

== Background ==
Autoacceleration of the overall rate of a free-radical polymerization system has been noted in many bulk polymerization systems. The polymerization of methyl methacrylate, for example, deviates strongly from classical mechanism behavior around 20% conversion; in this region the conversion and molecular mass of the polymer produced increases rapidly. This increase of polymerization is usually accompanied by a large rise in temperature if heat dissipation is not adequate. Without proper precautions, autoacceleration of polymerization systems could cause metallurgic failure of the reaction vessel or, worse, explosion.

To avoid the occurrence of thermal runaway due to autoacceleration, suspension polymerization techniques are employed to make polymers such as polystyrene. The droplets dispersed in the water are small reaction vessels, but the heat capacity of the water lowers the temperature rise, thus moderating the reaction.

== Causes ==
Norrish and Smith, Trommsdorff, and later, Schultz and Harborth, concluded that autoacceleration must be caused by a totally different polymerization mechanism. They rationalized through experiment that a decrease in the termination rate was the basis of the phenomenon. This decrease in termination rate, k_{t}, is caused by the raised viscosity of the polymerization region when the concentration of previously formed polymer molecules increases. Before autoacceleration, chain termination by combination of two free-radical chains is a very rapid reaction that occurs at very high frequency (about one in 10^{4} collisions). However, when the growing polymer molecules – with active free-radical ends – are surrounded in the highly viscous mixture consisting of a growing concentration of "dead" polymer, the rate of termination becomes limited by diffusion. The Brownian motion of the larger molecules in the polymer "soup" is restricted, therefore limiting the frequency of their effective (termination) collisions.

== Results ==
With termination collisions restricted, the concentration of active polymerizing chains and simultaneously the consumption of monomer rises rapidly. Assuming abundant unreacted monomer, viscosity changes affect the macromolecules but do not prove high enough to prevent smaller molecules – such as the monomer – from moving relatively freely. Therefore, the propagation reaction of the free-radical polymerization process is relatively insensitive to changes in viscosity. This also implies that at the onset of autoacceleration the overall rate of reaction increases relative to the rate of un-autoaccelerated reaction given by the overall rate of reaction equation for free-radical polymerization:

$$R_p = k_p \cdot \ce{[M]} \sqrt{ \frac{f \cdot k_d \cdot \ce{[I]} }{k_t} }$$

where

R_{p} is the rate of polymerization
[M] is the concentration of monomer
[I] is the concentration of initiator
k_{d} is the dissociation constant
k_{p} is the rate constant for propagation
k_{t} is the rate constant for chain transfer
f is the fraction of initiators which initiate chain growth

Approximately, as the termination decreases by a factor of 4, the overall rate of reaction will double. The decrease of termination reactions also allows radical chains to add monomer for longer time periods, raising the mass-average molecular mass dramatically. However, the number-average molecular mass only increases slightly, leading to broadening of the molecular mass distribution (high dispersity, very polydispersed product).

== Bibliography ==
- Dvornic, Petar R., and Jacovic S. Milhailo. "The Viscosity Effect on Autoacceleration of the Rate of Free Radical Polymerization". Wiley InterScience. 6 December 2007.
