= FENE model =

Model representing the dynamics of a long-chained polymer

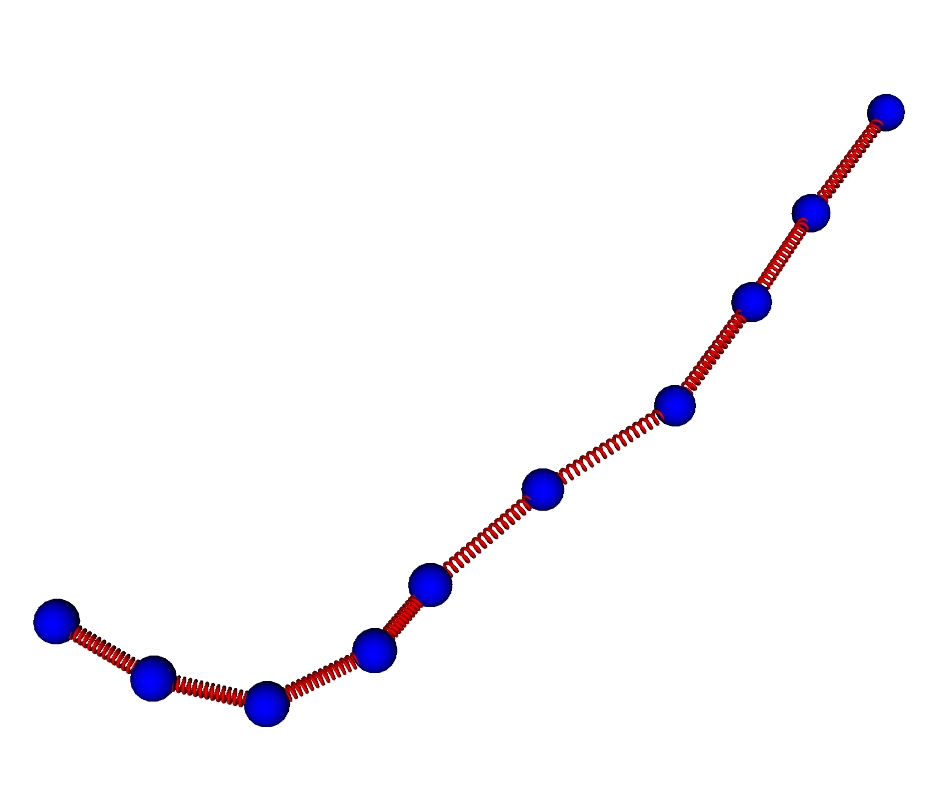
An example of multi-bead FENE model

In polymer physics, the finite extensible nonlinear elastic (FENE) model, also called the FENE dumbbell model, represents the dynamics of a long-chained polymer. It simplifies the chain of monomers by connecting a sequence of beads with nonlinear springs.

Its direct extension the FENE-P model, is more commonly used in computational fluid dynamics to simulate turbulent flow. The P stands for the last name of physicist Anton Peterlin, who developed an important approximation of the model in 1966. The FENE-P model was introduced by Robert Byron Bird et al. in the 1980s.

In 1991 the FENE-MP model (PM for modified Peterlin) was introduced and in 1988 the FENE-CR was introduced by M.D. Chilcott and J.M. Rallison.

== Formulation ==
The spring force in the FENE model is given Warner's spring force, as

$$\textbf{F}_i=k\frac{\textbf{R}_i}{1-(R_i/L_{\rm max})^2}$$,

where $R_i = |\textbf{R}_i|$, k is the spring constant and Lmax the upper limit for the length extension. Total stretching force on i-th bead can be written as $\textbf{F}_i - \textbf{F}_{i-1}$.

The Werner's spring force approximate the inverse Langevin function found in other models.

== FENE-P model ==
The FENE-P model takes the FENE model and assumes the Peterlin statistical average for the restoring force as

$$\textbf{F}_i=k\frac{\textbf{R}_i}{1-\lang R^2_i/L_{\rm max}^2\rang}$$,

where the $\lang\cdots\rang$ indicates the statistical average.

=== Advantages and disadvantages ===
FENE-P is one of few polymer models that can be used in computational fluid dynamics simulations since it removes the need of statistical averaging at each grid point at any instant in time. It is demonstrated to be able to capture some of the most important polymeric flow behaviors such as polymer turbulence drag reduction and shear thinning. It is the most commonly used polymer model that can be used in a turbulence simulation since direct numerical simulation of turbulence is already extremely expensive.

Due to its simplifications FENE-P is not able to show the hysteresis effects that polymers have, while the FENE model can.
