= Drag reducing agent =

Drag-reducing agents (DRA) or drag-reducing polymers (DRP) are additives in pipelines that reduce turbulence in a pipe. Usually used in petroleum pipelines, they increase the pipeline capacity by reducing turbulency and increasing laminar flow.

== Description ==
Drag reducing agents can be broadly classified under the following four categories – Polymers, Solid-particle suspensions, Biological additives, and Surfactants. These agents are made out of high molecular weight polymers or micellar systems. The polymers help with drag reduction by decreasing turbulence in the oil lines. This allows for oil to be pumped through at lower pressures, saving energy and money. Although these drag reducing agents are mostly used in oil lines, there is research being done to see how helpful polymers could be in reducing drag in veins and arteries.

== How it works ==
Using just a few parts per million of the drag reducer helps to reduce the turbulence inside the pipe. Because the oil pushes up against the inside wall of the pipe, the pipe pushes the oil back down causing a swirling of turbulence to occur which creates a drag force. When the polymer is added, it interacts with the oil and the wall to help reduce the contact of the oil with the wall.

Degradation can occur on the polymers during the flow. Because of the pressure and temperature on the polymers, it is easier to break them down. Because of this, the drag reducing agent is re-injected after points like pumps and turns, where the pressure and temperature can be especially high. To safeguard against degradation at high temperature, a different class of drag reducing agents are at times used, namely, surfactants. Surfactant is a contraction of the term Surface-active agent. It connotes an organic molecule or an unformulated compound having surface-active properties. All three classes of surfactants, namely, anionic, cationic and nonionic surfactants, have been successfully used as drag-reducing agents.

Knowing what will create the ideal drag reducer is key in this process. Ideal molecules have a high molecular weight, shear degradation resistance, are quick to dissolve in whatever is in the pipe, and have low degradation in heat, light, chemicals, and biological areas.

With drag reduction, there are many factors which play a role in how well the drag is reduced. A main factor in this is temperature. With a higher temperature, the drag reducing agent is easier to degrade. At a low temperature the drag reducing agent will tend to cluster together. This problem can be solved easier than degradation though, by adding another chemical, such as aluminum to help lower the drag reducing agent's inter-molecular attraction.

Other factors are the pipe diameter, inside roughness, and pressure. Drag is higher in smaller diameter pipe. The rougher the inside surface of the pipe, the higher the drag, or friction, which is calculated using the Reynolds number. Increasing the pressure will increase flow and reduce drag but is limited by the maximum pressure rating of the pipe.

== Areas of use ==
Drag reducing agents have been found useful in reducing turbulence in the shipbuilding industry, for fire-fighting operations, oil-well fracturing processes, in irrigation systems and in central heating devices. Drag reducers can work in a couple of different fields. The most popular are crude oil, refined products and non-potable water. Currently there are several studies with ongoing tests in rats examining if drag reducers can help with blood flow.

== History ==
The earliest works that recorded a decrease in pressure drop during turbulent flow were undertaken in the thirties and concerned the transportation of paper pulp. This was, however, not explicitly referred to as a drag reduction phenomenon. B. A. Toms was the first to recognize the tremendous reduction in wall shear stress caused by the addition of small amount of linear macromolecules to a turbulent flowing fluid. This effect is known as the Toms effect. An extensive bibliography of the first 25 years of drag reduction by polymer additives literature identified over 270 references.

Drag reducers were introduced into the market in the early 1970s by Conoco Inc. (now known as LiquidPower Specialty Products Inc. (LSPI), a Berkshire Hathaway company). Its use has allowed pipeline systems to greatly increase in traditional capacity and extended the life of existing systems. The higher flow rates possible on long pipelines have also increased the potential for surge on older systems not previously designed for high velocities.

Both proprietary (such as Conoco T-83) and non-proprietary (such as poly-isobutylene) drag reduction additives have been evaluated by the U.S. Army Mobility Equipment Research and Development Center for enhancement of military petroleum pipeline systems.
