= Polymerization =

Chemical reaction to form polymer chains

In polymer chemistry, polymerization (American English), or polymerisation (British English), is a process of reacting monomer molecules together in a chemical reaction to form polymer chains or three-dimensional networks. There are many forms of polymerization and different systems exist to categorize them.

In chemical compounds, polymerization can occur via a variety of reaction mechanisms that vary in complexity due to the functional groups present in the reactants and their inherent steric effects. In more straightforward polymerizations, alkenes form polymers through relatively simple radical reactions; in contrast, reactions involving substitution at a carbonyl group require more complex synthesis due to the way in which reactants polymerize.

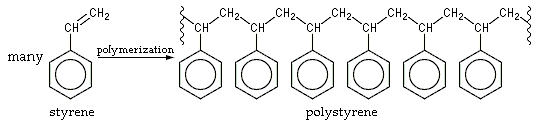
An example of alkene polymerization, in which each styrene monomer's double bond reforms as a single bond plus a bond to another styrene monomer. The product is polystyrene.

As alkenes can polymerize in somewhat straightforward radical reactions, they form useful compounds such as polyethylene and polyvinyl chloride (PVC), which are produced in high tonnages each year due to their usefulness in manufacturing processes of commercial products, such as piping, insulation and packaging. In general, polymers such as PVC are referred to as "homopolymers", as they consist of repeated long chains or structures of the same monomer unit, whereas polymers that consist of more than one monomer unit are referred to as copolymers (or co-polymers).

Homopolymers
$$A + A + A+... \rightarrow AAAA ...$$
Copolymers
$A + B + A+B... \rightarrow ABAB ...$
$A + B + A+B... \rightarrow AABB ...$
$A + B + A+B... \rightarrow BBAB ...$

Other monomer units, such as formaldehyde hydrates or simple aldehydes, are able to polymerize themselves at quite low temperatures (ca. −80 °C) to form trimers; molecules consisting of 3 monomer units, which can cyclize to form ring cyclic structures, or undergo further reactions to form tetramers, or 4 monomer-unit compounds. Such small polymers are referred to as oligomers. Generally, because formaldehyde is an exceptionally reactive electrophile it allows nucleophilic addition of hemiacetal intermediates, which are in general short-lived and relatively unstable "mid-stage" compounds that react with other non-polar molecules present to form more stable polymeric compounds.

Polymerization that is not sufficiently moderated and proceeds at a fast rate can be very dangerous. This phenomenon is known as autoacceleration, and can cause fires and explosions.

== Step-growth vs. chain-growth polymerization ==
Step-growth and chain-growth are the main classes of polymerization reaction mechanisms. The former is often easier to implement but requires precise control of stoichiometry. The latter more reliably affords high molecular-weight polymers, but only applies to certain monomers.

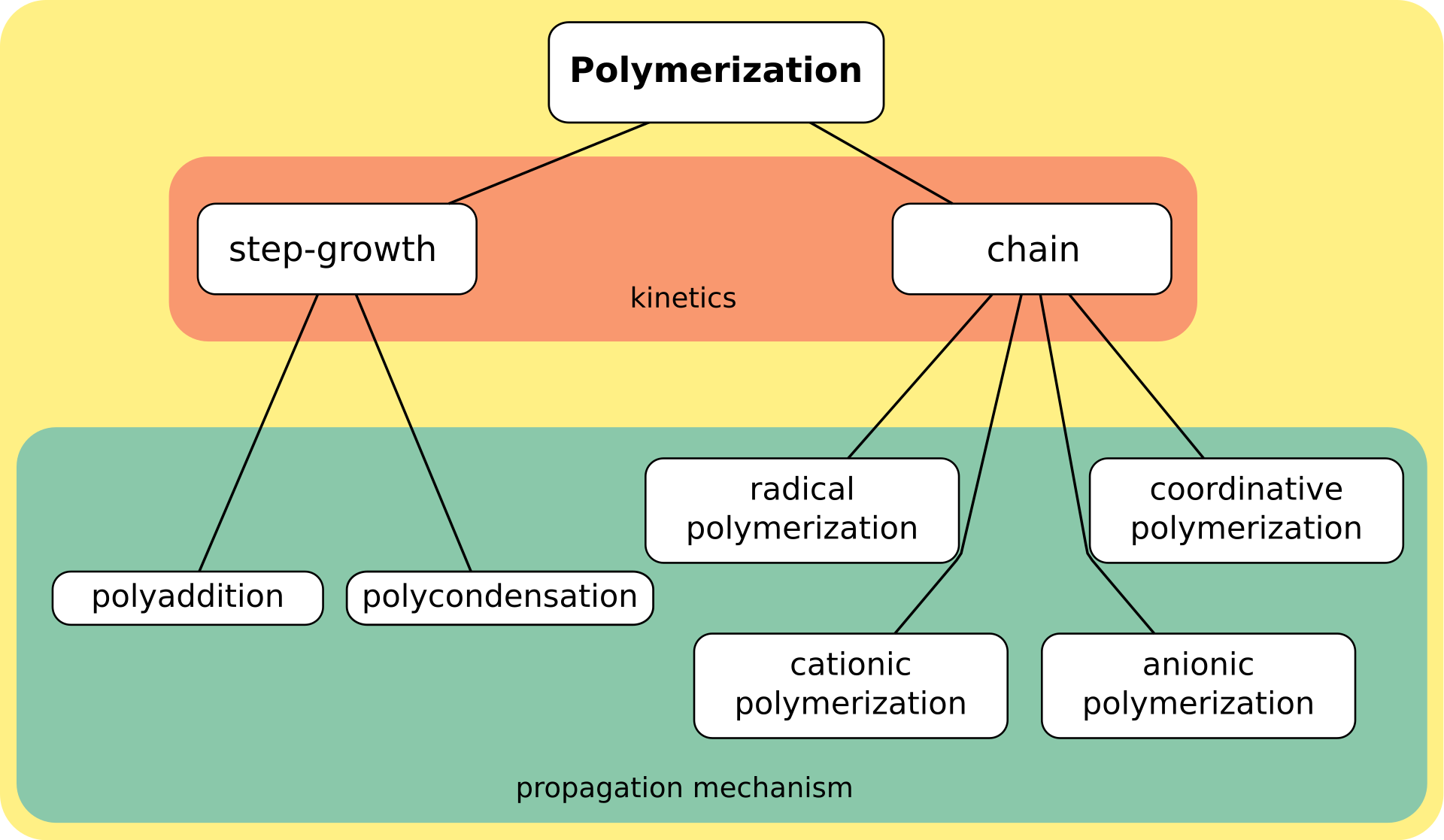
A classification of the polymerization reactions

=== Step-growth ===
In step-growth (or step) polymerization, pairs of reactants, of any lengths, combine at each step to form a longer polymer molecule. The average molar mass increases slowly. Long chains form only late in the reaction.

Step-growth polymers are formed by independent reaction steps between functional groups of monomer units, usually containing heteroatoms such as nitrogen or oxygen. Most step-growth polymers are also classified as condensation polymers, since a small molecule such as water is lost when the polymer chain is lengthened. For example, polyester chains grow by reaction of alcohol and carboxylic acid groups to form ester links with loss of water. However, there are exceptions; for example polyurethanes are step-growth polymers formed from isocyanate and alcohol bifunctional monomers) without loss of water or other volatile molecules, and are classified as addition polymers rather than condensation polymers.

Step-growth polymers increase in molecular weight very slowly at low conversion and reach moderately high molecular weights only at very high conversion (i.e., >95%). Solid state polymerization to afford polyamides (e.g., nylons) is an example of step-growth polymerization.

=== Chain-growth ===
In chain-growth (or chain) polymerization, the only chain-extension reaction step is the addition of a monomer to a growing chain with an active center such as a free radical, cation, or anion. Once the growth of a chain is initiated by formation of an active center, chain propagation is usually rapid by addition of a sequence of monomers. Long chains are formed from the beginning of the reaction.

Chain-growth polymerization (or addition polymerization) involves the linking together of unsaturated monomers, particularly those containing carbon-carbon double bonds. The pi-bond is lost by formation of a new sigma bond. Chain-growth polymerization is involved in the manufacture of polymers such as polyethylene, polypropylene, polyvinyl chloride (PVC), and acrylate. In these cases, the alkenes RCH=CH_{2} are converted to high molecular weight alkanes (-RCHCH_{2}-)_{n} (R = H, CH_{3}, Cl, CO_{2}CH_{3}).

Other forms of chain growth polymerization include cationic addition polymerization and anionic addition polymerization. A special case of chain-growth polymerization leads to living polymerization. Ziegler–Natta polymerization allows considerable control of polymer branching.

Polymerization of ethylene

Diverse methods are employed to manipulate the initiation, propagation, and termination rates during chain polymerization. A related issue is temperature control, also called heat management, during these reactions, which are often highly exothermic. For example, for the polymerization of ethylene, 93.6 kJ of energy are released per mole of monomer.

The manner in which polymerization is conducted is a highly evolved technology. Methods include emulsion polymerization, solution polymerization, suspension polymerization, and precipitation polymerization. Although the polymer dispersity and molecular weight may be improved, these methods may introduce additional processing requirements to isolate the product from a solvent.

=== Photopolymerization ===
Most photopolymerization reactions are chain-growth polymerizations which are initiated by the absorption of visible or ultraviolet light. Photopolymerization can also be a step-growth polymerization. The light may be absorbed either directly by the reactant monomer (direct photopolymerization), or else by a photosensitizer which absorbs the light and then transfers energy to the monomer. In general, only the initiation step differs from that of the ordinary thermal polymerization of the same monomer; subsequent propagation, termination, and chain-transfer steps are unchanged. In step-growth photopolymerization, absorption of light triggers an addition (or condensation) reaction between two comonomers that do not react without light. A propagation cycle is not initiated because each growth step requires the assistance of light.

Photopolymerization can be used as a photographic or printing process because polymerization only occurs in regions which have been exposed to light. Unreacted monomer can be removed from unexposed regions, leaving a relief polymeric image. Several forms of 3D printing—including layer-by-layer stereolithography and two-photon absorption 3D photopolymerization—use photopolymerization.

Multiphoton polymerization using single pulses have also been demonstrated for fabrication of complex structures using a digital micromirror device.

== See also ==
- Cross-link
- Enzymatic polymerization
- In situ polymerization
- Metallocene
- Plasma polymerization
- Polymer characterization
- Polymer physics
- Reversible addition−fragmentation chain-transfer polymerization
- Ring-opening polymerization
- Sequence-controlled polymers
- Sol-gel
