= Methacrylate copolymer =

Methacrylate copolymers are a group of polymeric compounds used as food additives. The E numbers are E1205, E1206, and E1207, depending on whether the substance is basic, neutral, or anionic, respectively.

== Uses ==
The basic form is used as a glazing agent in solid food supplements and in solid foods for special medical purposes (FSMPs).

The neutral form is used as a glazing agent in solid food supplements and solid FSMPs.

The anionic form is used as a glazing agent in solid food supplements and solid FSMPs. Sodium lauryl sulfate, a non-authorised ingredient, was found to be present in some samples.
