= Polyfullerene =

Polyfullerene is a basic polymer of the C_{60} monomer group, in which fullerene segments are connected via covalent bonds into a polymeric chain without side or bridging groups. They are called intrinsic polymeric fullerenes, or more often all C_{60} polymers.

Fullerene can be part of a polymer chain in many different ways. Fullerene-containing polymers are divided into following structural categories:

- Intrinsic polymeric fullerene (homopolymer),
- Main-chain polymers,
- Side-chain polymers,
- Star polymers,
- Crosslinked polymers,
- End-caped polymers.

== History ==
Fullerene is a relatively new substance in chemistry sciences. Buckminsterfullerene itself was discovered in 1985 and the first fullerene-containing polymers were reported at least 6 years later.

The main milestones in the use of fullerene in polymer chemistry are listed below:

- 1992 – Synthesis of organometallic C_{60} polymer (C_{60}Pd_{3})_{n}
- 1995 – Synthesis of C_{60} containing polyurethane and C_{60}-styrene copolymer
- 1996 – Synthesis of fullerene side-chain polymer
- 1997 – Synthesis of fullerene polymer with C_{60} in the backbone by Diels-Alder reaction
- 2001 – Synthesis of star-shaped C_{60} (co)polymers

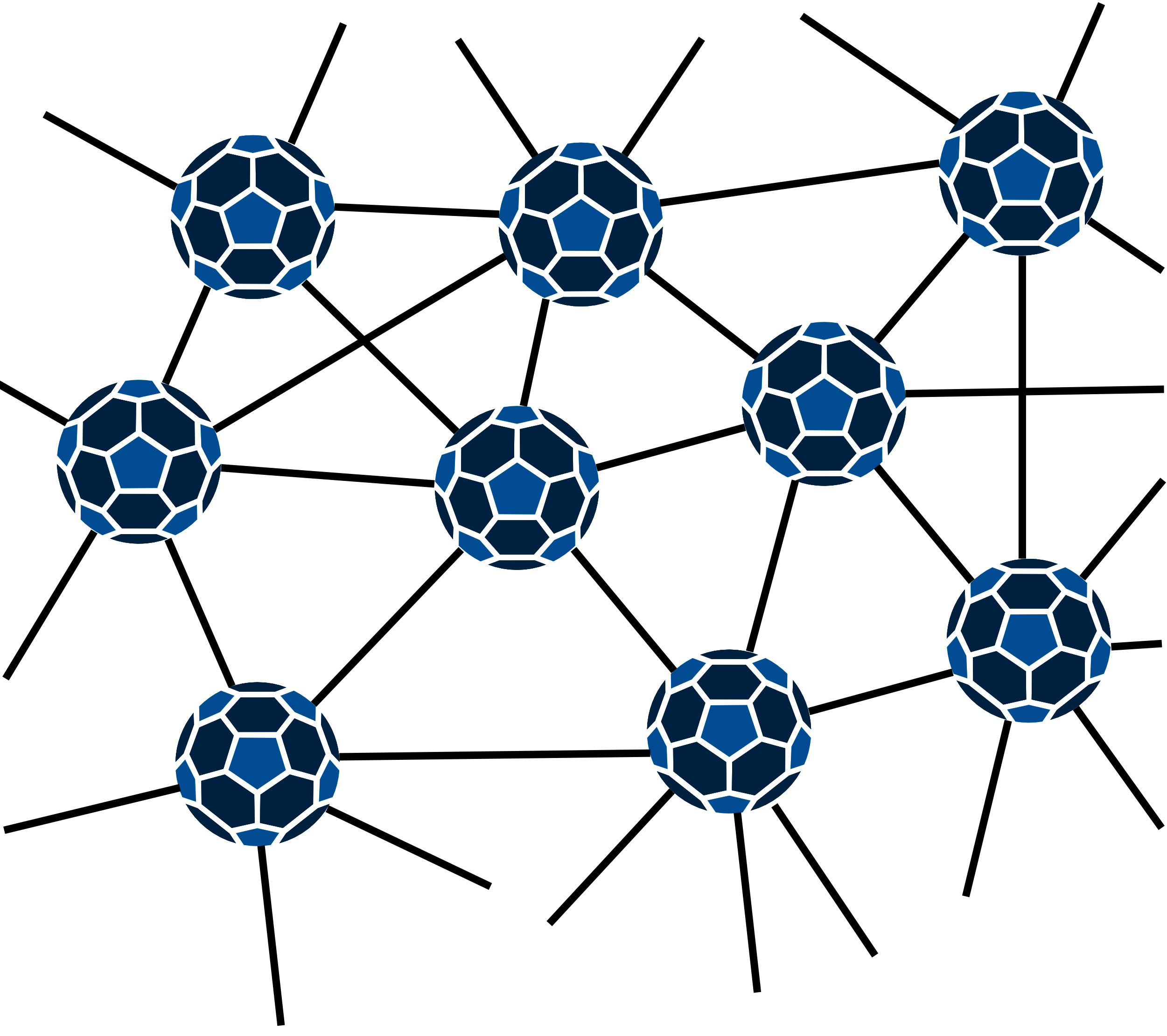
Schematic of polyfullerene grid

== Fullerene polymers ==
High content of double bonds in the fullerene molecule (30 double bonds in Buckminsterfullerene) leads to crosslinking and formation of regioisomers. Polymerization without any sophisticated control of forming structure leads to very high randomization of polymer grid. Thus, linking units of second monomer are needed to prepare linear copolymers (see main-chain polymers).

This group includes heteroatomic C_{60} polymers containing non-carbon atoms in polyfullerene chains.

== Preparations ==
This section describes most of the main structural types of fullerene-containing polymers.

=== Homopolymer ===
Polyfullerenes can be prepared via many polymerization mechanisms. Research is mainly focused on photopolymerization, polymerization under high pressure and charge-transfer polymerization.

The most likely connection of fullerene units is [2+2] cycloaddition of two double bonds of the benzene parts of fullerene molecules. Cycloaddition provides a cyclobutane ring connecting two fullerene molecules.

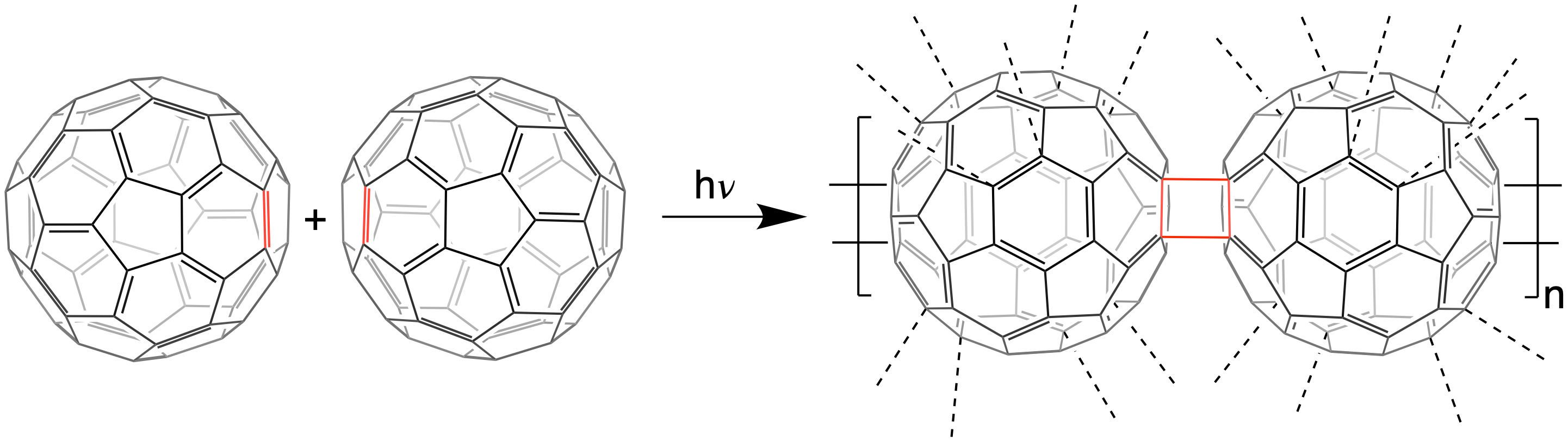
Photopolymerization of C60 Buckminsterfullerene forming cyclobutane bond via [2+2] cycloadition

=== Main-chain polymers ===
Main-chain polymers are characterized by the presence of fullerene units in the polymer backbone. They are not heteroatomic fullerene homopolymers but linear fullerene copolymers.

The structure can be described as necklace-type. One approach to achieving fullerene main-chain polymers is by copolymerizing fullerene with a difunctional monomer. Second option is polycondensation of bifunctionalized fullerene with monomer bearing compatible functional groups.

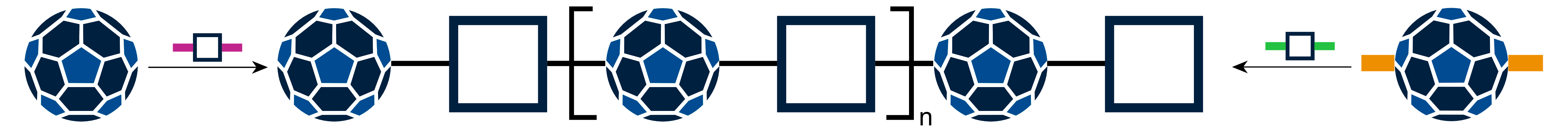
Scheme of synthetic approaches for obtaining fullerene main-chain polymers.

Fullerene copolymers can be obtained through standard polymerization techniques used for industrially standard polymers. Examples of first approach are Diels-Alder addition and free radical copolymerization. Fullerene can be copolymerized with methylmethacrylate by initiation with azobisisobutyronitrile (AIBN).

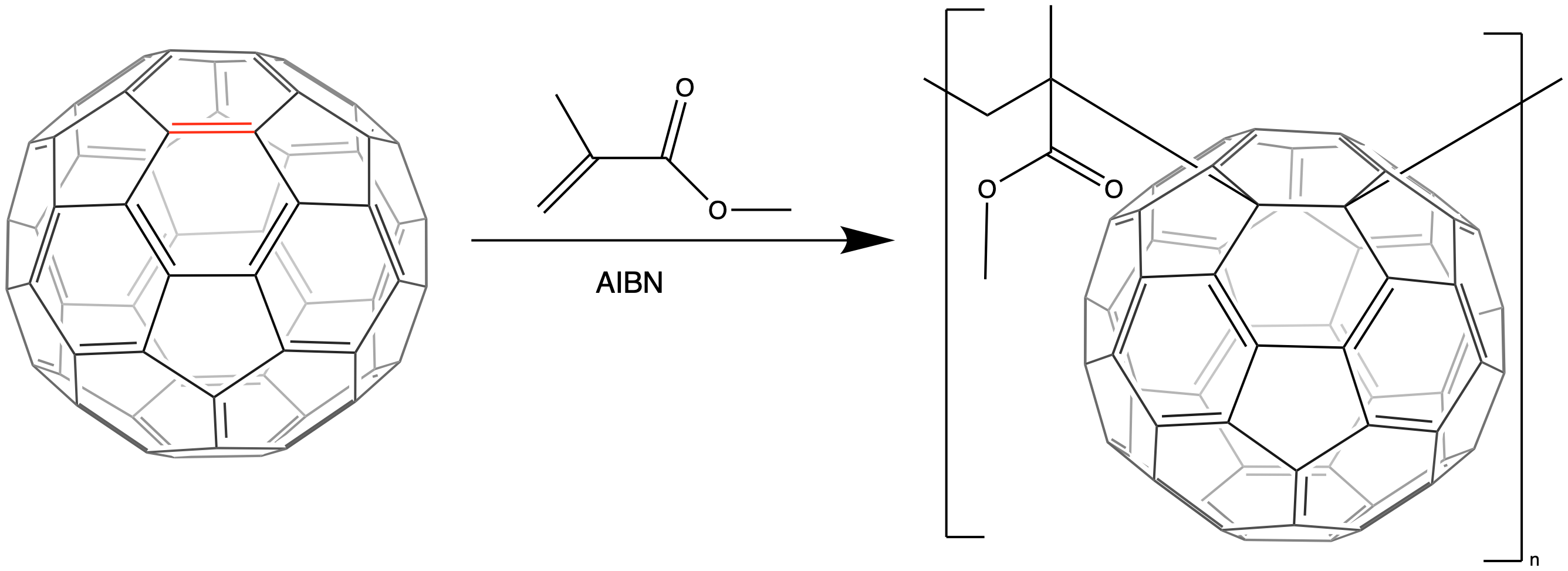
Free radical copolymerization of methylmethacrylate and C_{60} Buckminsterfullerene

In Diels-Alder copolymerization fullerene acts as a dienophile with diene to form a cyclohexene ring. The figure below shows Diels-Alder reaction with the simplest diene – buta-1,3-diene. Comonomer must contain two pairs of conjugated double bonds in order to react with two fullerene molecules obtaining linear polymeric chain molecules. Used monomers are usually bulkier than conventional monomers in order to compensate the space requirements of fullerene spheres.

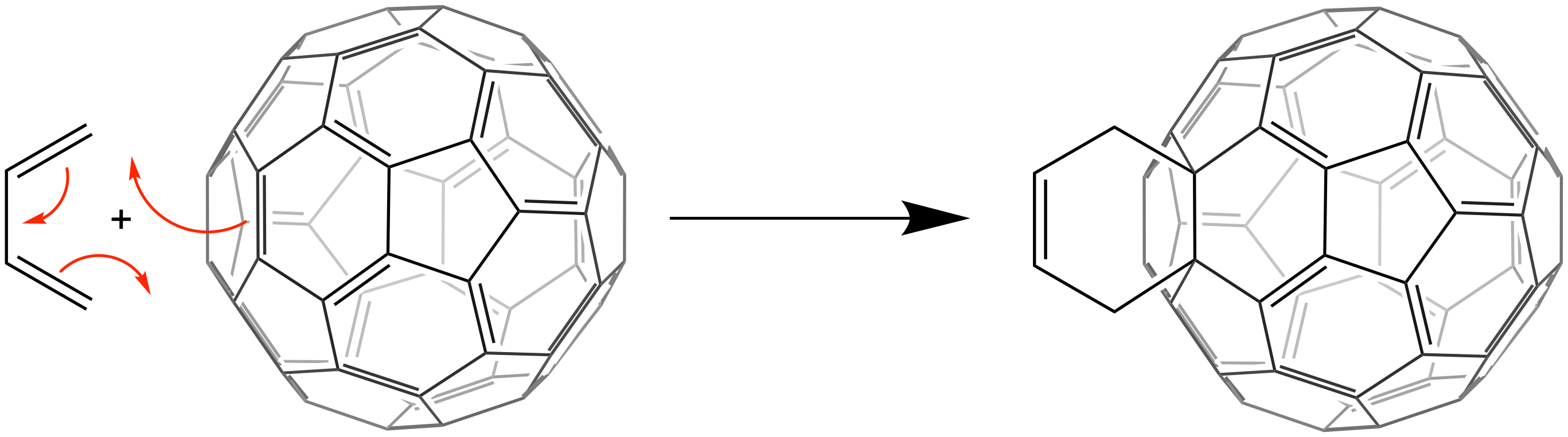

=== Side-chain polymers ===
Most fullerene polymers fall into this category. Similarly to the previous polymer type, two synthetic approaches are available. First, bonding fullerene spheres onto a polymerized chain or second, polymerizing monomer unit already bearing fullerene.

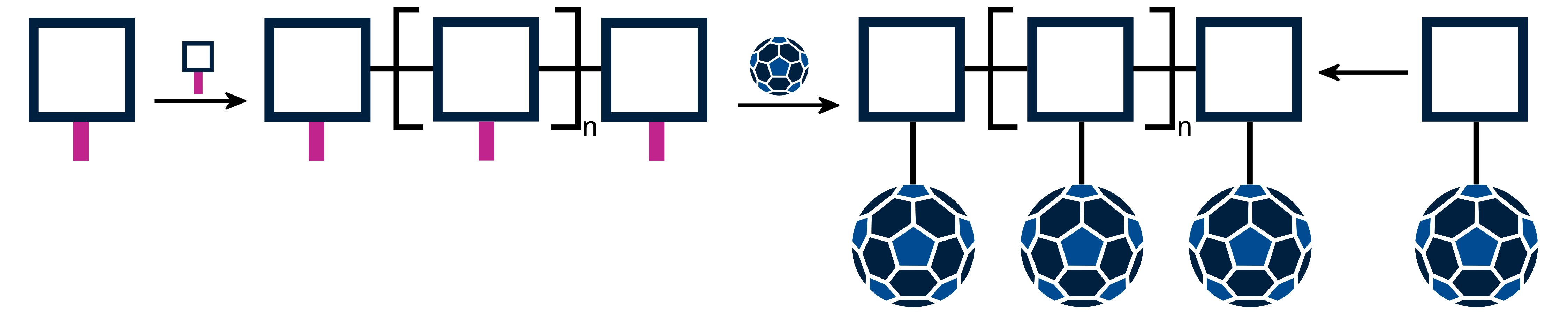
Scheme of synthetic approaches for obtaining fullerene side-chain polymers.

An example of the second approach is ring-opening metathesis polymerisation (ROMP) of norbornene bearing C_{60} or copolymerization of pure norbornene and C_{60} functionalized norbornene.

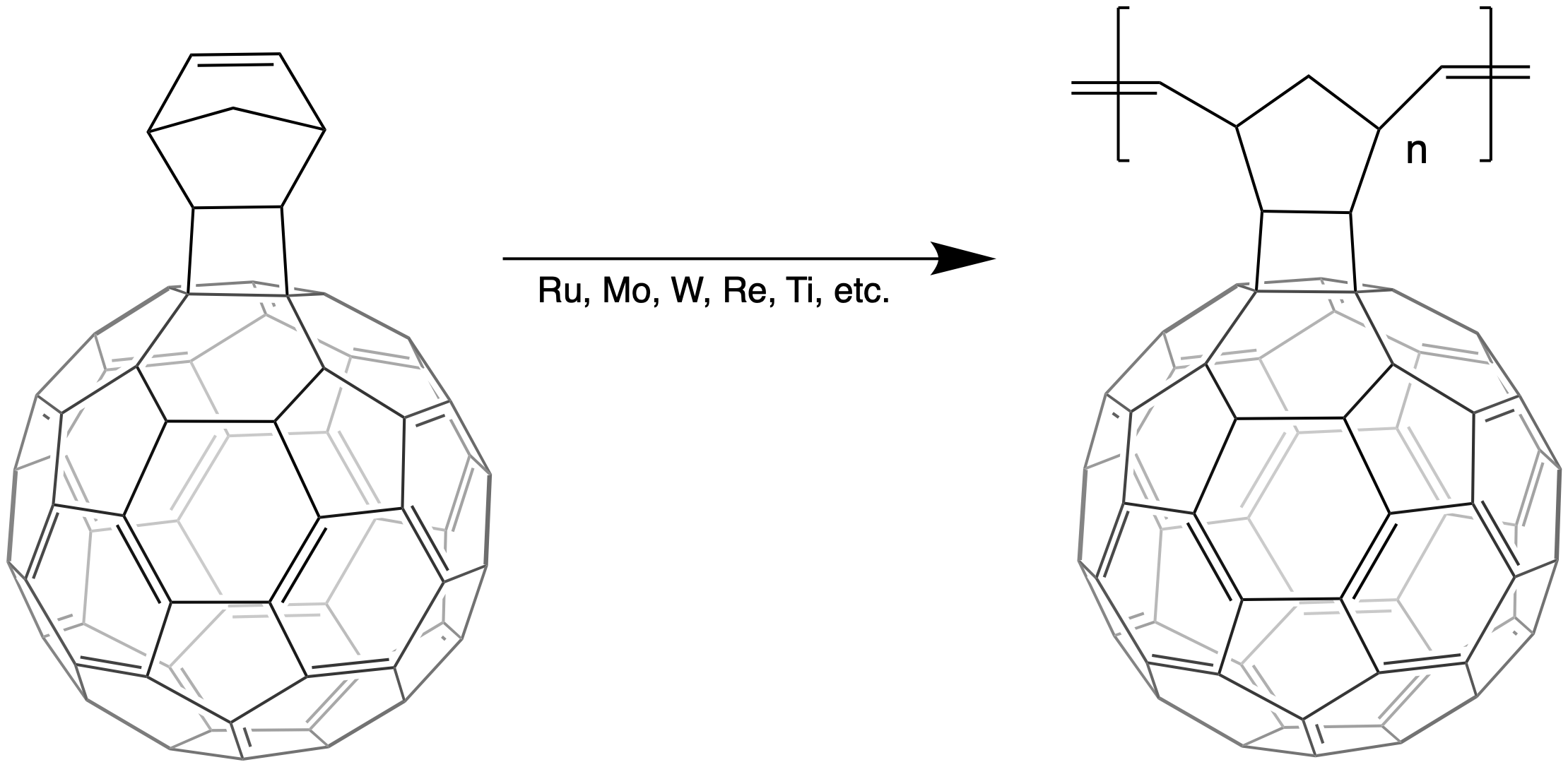
Ring Opening Methatesis Polymerization (ROMP) of C_{60} Buckminsterfullerene functionalized norbornene.

=== Cross-linked polymers ===
As mentioned earlier, Buckminsterfullerene is capable of multiple additions and basic polymerization conditions lead to a polymer grid. Fullerene behaves the same way in copolymerization. In free radical copolymerization of styrene and C_{60} fullerene, the resulting copolymer is cross-linked and heterogeneous.

Easy preparation of cross-linked fullerene polymer is copolymerization with polyurethanes. In this technique, fullerenol bearing up to 44 hydroxyl groups C_{60}(OH)_{4 – 44} and di- or tri- isocyanate prepolymers are used as initial substances. Successful syntheses were conducted in a mixture of dimethylformamide (DMF) and tetrahydrofuran (THF)(1:3) at 60 °C.

Fullerene End-caped polymers

Also incorrectly named “telechelic” polymers, but telechelic polymers have reactive functional end-groups. They can be synthesized by incorporating fullerenes onto the ends of polymerized chains or growth of a polymeric chain from a functionalized fullerene derivative and additionally closure. Introducing fullerene spheres into the end of the macromolecule significantly increases hydrophobicity of the original polymer.

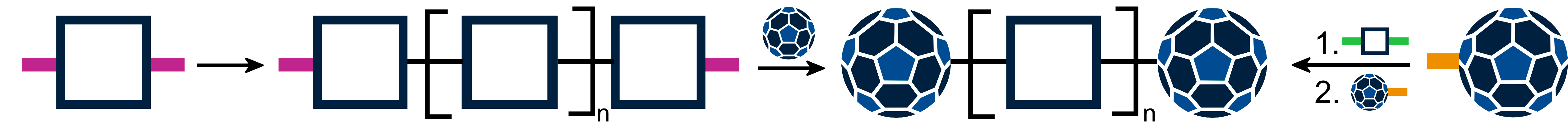
Scheme of synthetic approaches for obtaining fullerene end-caped polymers.

=== Star-shaped polymers ===
Star fullerene polymers can be prepared by two major approaches.

Reported star fullerene polymers were prepared by anionic copolymerization with polystyrene to form C_{60}(CH_{2}CH(C_{6}H_{5}))_{x})_{n}, where n stands for the number of polystyrene star “arms” from 2 to 6. Second approach is growing polymer chains directly from fullerene derivative C_{60}Cl_{n} (n = 16–20) by atom transfer radical polymerization. The chlorine fullerene derivative virtually works as an ATRP initiator. Countless polymers can be used for star arms.

Polyphenylakyne polymers can be used as an example since they give photoemitting macromolecules when grafted onto fullerene. C_{60}-poly(1-phenyl-1-propyne) can be prepared via wolfram-catalyzed metathesis reaction connecting prepared poly(1-phenyl-1-propyne) onto the fullerene by carbene addition resulting in cyclopropane connecting ring. Fullerene acts as a cocatalyst since tungsten catalyst (WCl_{6}-Ph_{4}Sn) is not able to polymerize 1-phenyl-1-propyne itself.

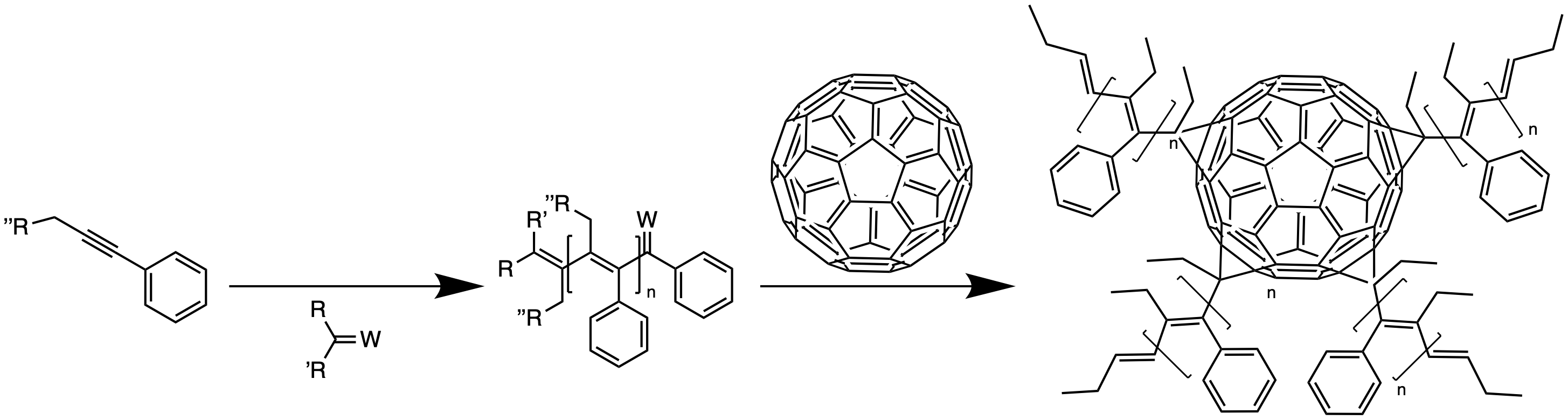
Copolymerization of 1-phenyl-1-propyne with C_{60} Buckminsterfullerene catalyzed by tungsten catalyst.

== Applications ==
Polyfullerenes are currently in an early research phase and real-world applications or even industrial production solutions are yet to be found. The main reasons for this are the novelty of combining fullerene chemistry with polymer chemistry and the fact that fullerene can be currently synthesized on a scale of a few grams. All-C_{60} polymers exhibit practically no solubility, thus preventing proper testing of processability and chemical properties.

Upcoming text only refers to potential applications of fullerene polymers according to founded properties of particular macromolecules.

=== Electronics ===
Fullerene itself stands out in the class of organic compounds because of its electronic properties. Current research studies utilization of fullerene by bonding it onto an optimal polymeric substrate. Practical reasons are easy processability of polymers and low price in comparison to pure C_{60} fullerene.

Polymer backbones bearing fullerene spheres exhibit good or great photoconductivity and even generate photocurrent when exposed to white light.

C_{60}-polyvinylcarbazole (C_{60}–PVK) exhibits photoinduced electron transfer within the polymer, which could be used for digital rewritable memory electronic parts. Prototype of such part of indium tin oxide, fullerene polymer and aluminum (ITO/ C_{60}–PVK /Al) was capable to read, write and erase information for about 100 million times.

Polyvinylcabazole polymer grown from fullerene polychloride (C_{60}Cl_{n}) was observed to increase the intensity of radiated light of an electroluminescent device. This star polymer with three arms is acting as a hole-transporting layer for semiconductor parts of a device.

On the other hand, hole-trapping materials affect electroluminescence the same way. Double-cable polymers are also candidates for functional layers for OLED displays. Adding 1 wt. % into basic OLED material increased luminescence of the diode. Very promising hole-trapping materials are polyacetylene backbone polymers with fullerene in combination with different electron-accepting groups in branches.

Star copolymer (PS)_{x}C_{60}(PMMA)_{y} (polystyrene and polymethylmethacrylate being different star “arms”) acted as an active electroluminescence layer. It improved emitting of a semiconductor electroluminescence device by up to 20 times. C_{60}-poly(1-phenyl-1-propyne) is also reported to exhibit light emission. Fullerene moiety increased emission of blue light two times in comparison to pure poly(phenyl propyne). Stability and processability of such polymer is very good.

=== Solar panels ===
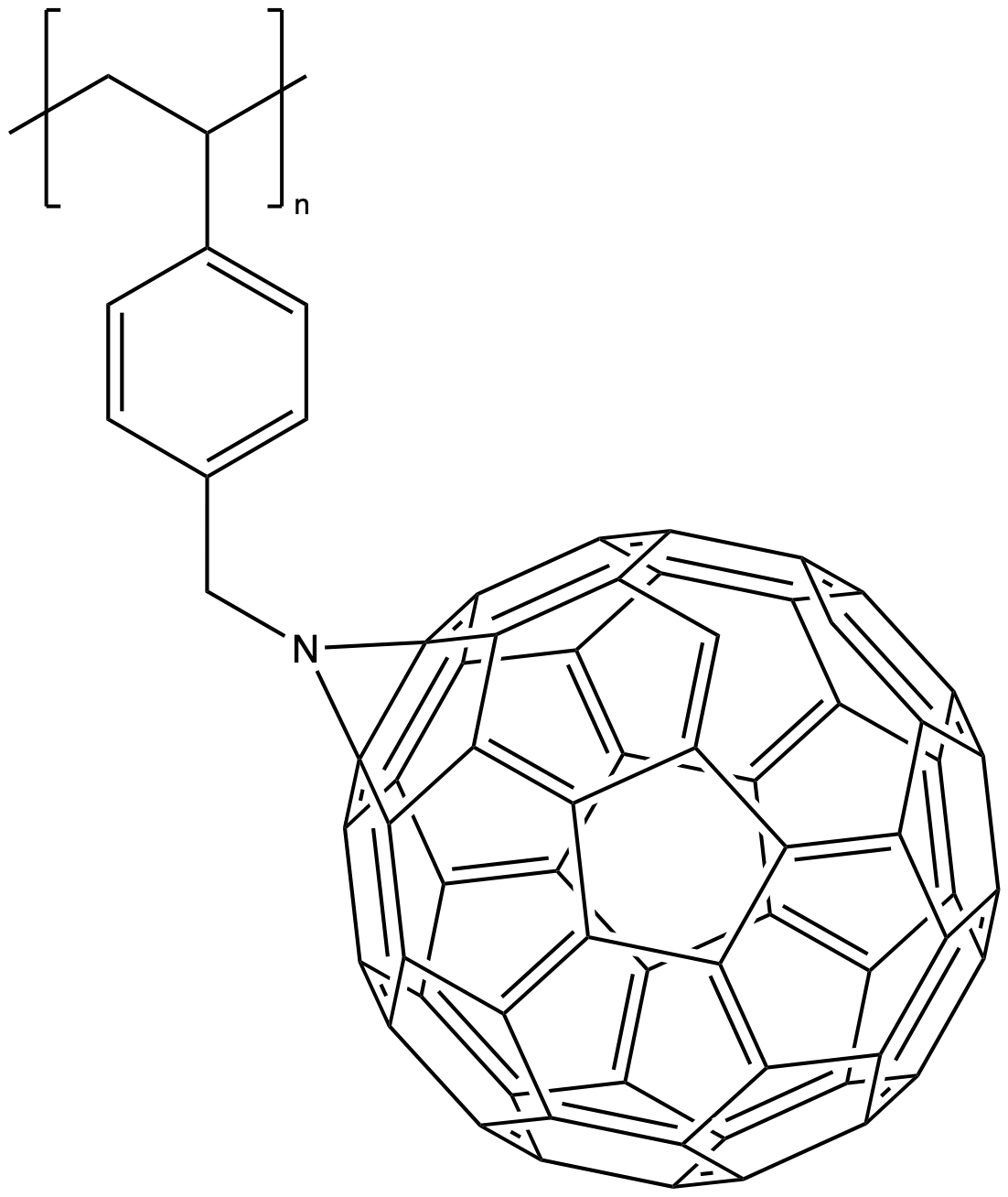
C_{60} Buckminsterfullerene-functionalised styrene side-chain homopolymer.

Fullerene polymers are widely studied in organic solar cells for active layers of new-generation photovoltaic panels. Examples are homopolymers of C_{60}-polystyrene and C_{60}-polyethyleneglycols or C_{60} copolymers prepared by ROMP polymerization. The current efficiency of converting incoming sun radiation to electricity is about 3%.

Another polymer type with intrinsic properties are “Double-Cable” polymers. They are brush-like structures consisting of 𝜋-electron conjugated backbone (P-type part) bearing electron-accepting branches (N-type part).

=== Optical limiting properties ===
Particular fullerene (co)polymers exhibit an optical limiting property, meaning they block intense light flux passing through them. Low intensity light flux is not affected. It is useful for light control parts in optics and as sensor or eye protection.

=== Surface activity ===
Currently, fullerene copolymerized with palladium showed some practical aspects, particularly (C_{60}Pd_{3})_{n} due to the content of palladium on its surface, exhibits catalytic effect for hydrogenation of alkenes and can lead to the development of new catalytic systems and products.

(C_{60}Pd)_{n} polymers can adsorb gases, making them useful as adsorbents for volatile and toxic species. For example, a great affinity to toluene was proved. The palladium atoms in the backbone are partially positive and thus attract 𝜋-electrons of aromatic core of toluene.

Introducing correct amount of fullerene as side groups onto poly(2,6-dimethyl-1,4-phenylene oxide) (PPO) increases permeability of gas separation membranes by 80% in comparison with pure PPO. Bulky fullerene probably increases the free volume of PPO.

=== Exceptional mechanical properties ===
Materials originating from polyurethane synthesis exhibit improved thermal mechanical stability. Fullerene-containing polyurethanes also exhibit strong optical response and are potentially applicable for optical signal processing.

Linear polymer chains containing fullerene undergo crosslinking. Resulting material exhibits elastomeric behavior with 10 times higher tensile strength and 17 times higher elongation at break than the same material without fullerene.

Blending of fullerene end-capped polymers (polyethylene glycols for example) with H-donating polymers (polyvinylchloride, poly(p-vinyl phenol), polymethylmethacrylate, etc.) leads to the enhancement of mechanical properties of H-donating polymers.

=== Scavengers of free radicals ===
Fullerene end-caped poly(N-isopropylacrylamide) is a water-soluble polymer with the tendency to form clusters. It is a very good scavenger of free radicals, and it can be used for controlling radical polymerizations.

=== Depolymerizeable polymers ===
Fullerene polymers are potential candidates for establishing polymer circular economy.

Depolymerizeable polymers are the hope of polymer recycling. C_{60} fullerene copolymerized with [4,4′-bithiazole]-2,2′-bis(diazonium)chloride (see Magnetic behavior) was observed to depolymerize in a temperature range of 60-75 °C. Polymerization and depolymerization can be done several times before degradation of initial components. The depolymerization temperature and the difference between polymerization and depolymerization temperatures must be increased.

=== Cancer treatment ===
Basic fullerene polymers without polar functional groups are strongly hydrophobic, thus incompatible for medicinal use in the human body.

An example of water-soluble derivatives are polyfullerocyclodextrins. They are prepared by reaction of 𝛽-cyclodextrin complexes with fullerene. They exhibit excellent DNA-cleaving activity (in the presence of visible light, they cleave DNA quantitatively). This phenomenon can be used for eliminating cancer cells.

The introduction of hydrophilic groups into the macromolecule is the principle of preparing water-soluble polymers. Examples of backbones for water-soluble fullerene side-chain polymers are for example poly(maleic anhydride-co-vinyl acetate) (52) or pullulan.

=== Magnetic behavior ===
Polymers with C_{60}-backbone with ferromagnetic properties were reported in literature, although fullerene itself is antiferromagnetic. An example of a successful synthesis of ferromagnetic C_{60}–polymer uses [4,4′-bithiazole]-2,2′-bis(diazonium)dichloride, C_{60} and FeSO_{4}.

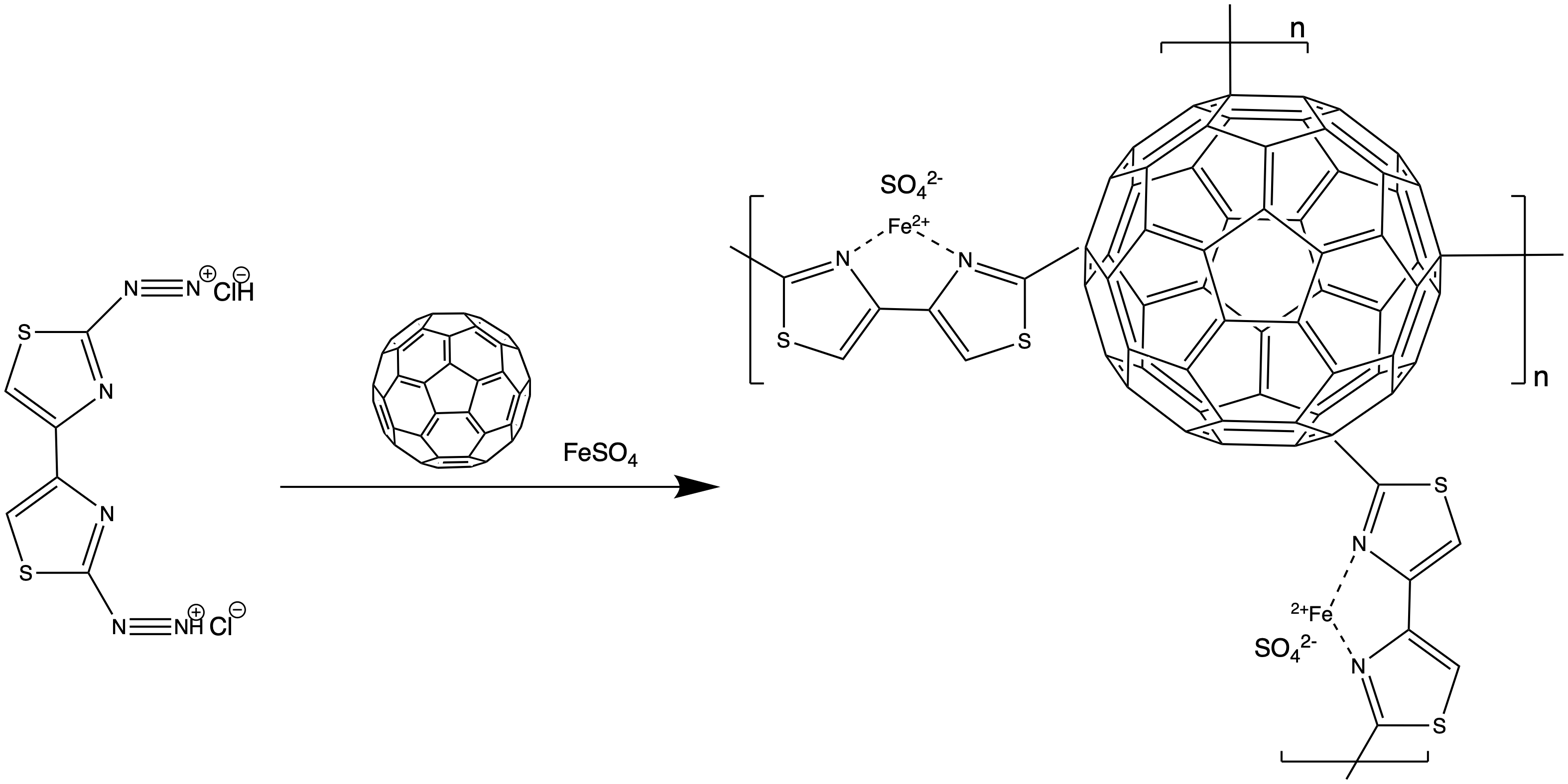
Soft magnetic copolymer of bithiazole derivative and C_{60} Buckminsterfullerene.
