= Poly(phthalaldehyde) =

Poly(phthalaldehyde), abbreviated as PPA, is a metastable stimuli-responsive polymer first synthesized in 1967. It has garnered significant attention during the past couple of years due to its ease of synthesis and outstanding transient and mechanical properties. For this reason, it has been exploited for a variety of applications including sensing, drug delivery, and EUV lithography. As of 2023, it is considered the only aromatic aldehyde polymerized through a living chain growth polymerization.

== Discovery and history ==
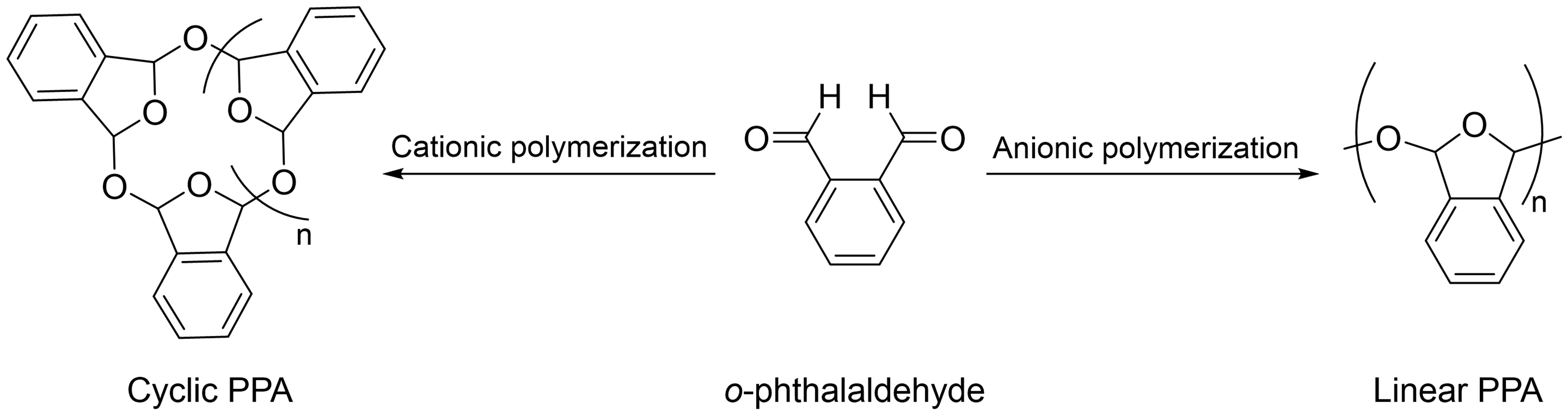
Polymerization of o-phthalaldehyde to give cyclic and linear PPA

Poly(phthalaldehyde) was first reported in 1967 by Chuji Aso and Sanae Tagami from the department of Organic Synthesis at Kyushu University by an addition homopolymerization reaction of aromatic o-phthalaldehyde. This polymer, consisting of a polyacetal main chain, is still to date, the only aromatic aldehyde that can be homopolymerized through a chain-growth polymerization method. It is a white brittle solid with a low ceiling temperature and significant self-immolative properties. It has gathered significant attention in recent years especially in the development of novel responsive materials and applications.

== Synthesis techniques ==
Since its first inception in 1967, many synthesis techniques have been developed and employed for the polymerization of o-phthalaldehyde. Most notably, living polymerization methods are among the most common and promising techniques used, as can be seen in the high number of publications in the literature depicting their usage in poly(phthalaldehyde) preparation.

=== Living cationic polymerization (LCP) ===
==== History and main idea ====
Aso and Tagami were the first to report the polymerization of o-phthalaldehyde in 1967 using the cationic living polymerization technique. This technique, which was initially thought to require the usage of a strong Brönsted acid to initiate polymerization in addition to a strong nucleophile to depress polymerization and endcap the polymer chain was proven successful in a number of polymerization processes reported earlier. Interestingly, the authors were able to produce this polymer without using an initiator nor a terminator and determined the polymer's structure to be cyclic. In fact, they worked at liquid nitrogen temperature and relied on Boron trifluoride etherate catalyst which was sufficient to produce a polymer stable enough at room temperature for a few days.

==== Current trends ====
In the following years, polymer chemists started studying the characteristics of this polymer and worked on enhancing its thermal stability and mechanical properties. In particular, Moore and coworkers conducted rigorous mechanistic studies on poly(phthalaldehyde) by modifying the type of catalyst used, as well as the starting monomer concentration in an effort to control the molar mass, decrease the polydispersity index, and increase the polymer's purity. Among the catalysts used were triethyloxonium borofluoride, tin chloride, and triphenylmethylium tetrafluoroborate.

==== Limitations ====
While LCP was the first and sole method used to produce poly(phthalaldehyde), its usage nowadays has dramatically decreased in favor of other polymerization techniques which allow a better control over the polymer properties including molar mass and thermal stability.

=== Living anionic polymerization (LAP) ===
==== History and main idea ====
While this polymerization technique did not typically gain fame and popularity until 2010, it was also reported by Aso and Tagami in 1969. In general, LAP involves the usage of a strong nucleophile to initiate polymerization in addition to the employment of an electrophile as a terminator to endcap the polymer chain. In Tagami's article, PPA was prepared by utilizing tert-butyllithium as an initiator and acetic anhydride as a terminator. However, the drawbacks faced when utilizing LCP (low polydispersity index (PDI), low yield, and no control over molecular weight) were also encountered in this polymerization technique.

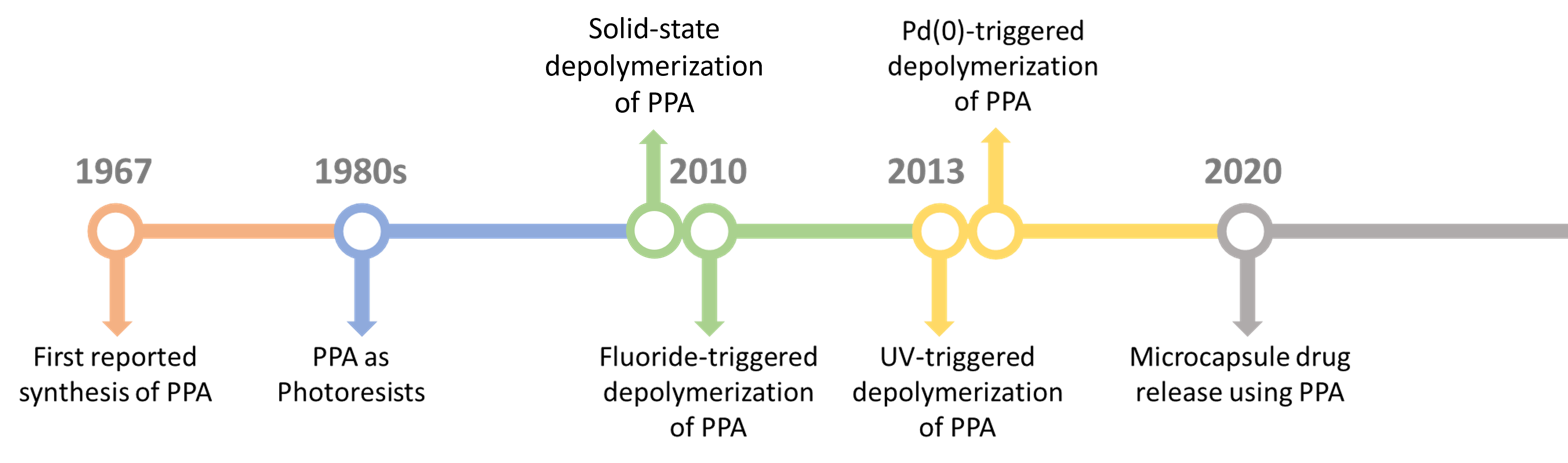
Timeline showing the first report of the applications of PPA

==== Current trends ====
It was not until 1987 when two chemists, Hedrick and Schlemper, from the University of Freiburg proposed the use of phosphazene bases to speed up the reaction and lower the polydispersity index. Up until 2023, three different phosphazene bases have been used in PPA polymerization. Moreover, most of the published research articles describing PPA synthesis between 2008 and 2023 revolve around the usage of LAP, rendering it the most common and effective polymerization technique.

==== Advantages ====
The major advantage this polymerization technique presents over LCP lies in the fact that the polymer can be end capped on both sides of the chain with stimuli-responsive groups. The tuning process of PPA by these functional groups have not only expanded the set of applications this polymer can be used in, but has also improved its properties and attributes. For instance, by controlling the o-phthalaldehyde monomer/alcohol initiator concentration ratio, ultra-high molecular weights (50-150 KDa) PPA can be obtained. Furthermore, PPA synthesized through LAP is more thermally and mechanically stable. Generally, the presence of endcaps on both ends stabilizes the polymer and results in a more flexible chain with a high thermal stability. And because linear polymers synthesized by LAP method can be end capped whereas cyclic polymers prepared via LCP method cannot be end capped with functional groups, LAP results in more thermally stable polymers. It has a much lower PDI ranging between 1.3 and 1.9 as opposed to PPA synthesized through LCP which has a PDI ranging between 2 and 4.5. This is because of the ability to control the character, molecular weight, and end group of the polymer. Furthermore, the initiator used in LAP synthesis method, which is a strong nucleophile, acts as the first endcap, and hence by controlling the amount of initiator used, a control over the molar mass and PDI can be obtained. This is in contrary to cyclic PPA which is synthesized through LCP where the initiator (Lewis acid) will not be part of the final PPA product, and hence, controlling the amount of Lewis acid used will have no to little effect on the final molar mass and PDI of cyclic PPA polymer.

=== Coordinative polymerization (CP) ===
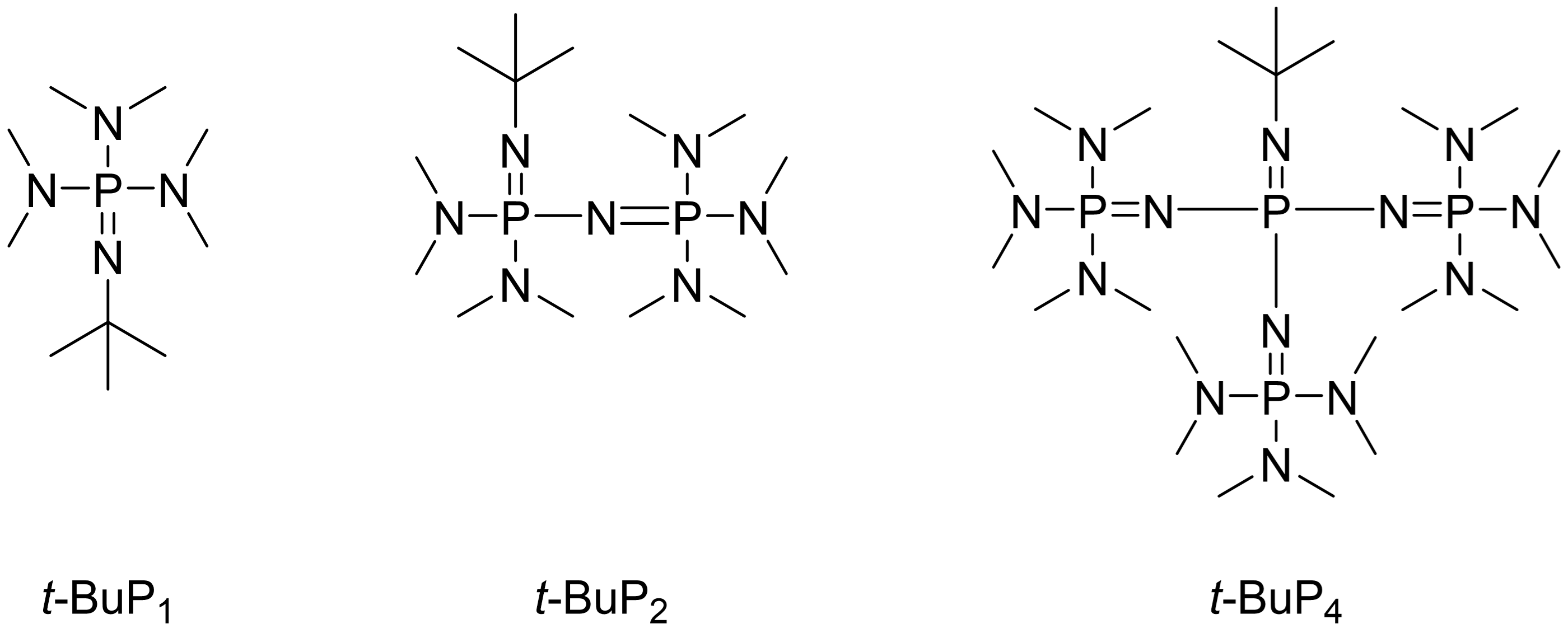
Structures of the phosphazene bases used as catalysts for PPA synthesis

Although a less known polymerization technique, coordinative polymerization has been used a few times in PPA preparation. It mostly requires the activation of transition metal catalysts with trimethylaluminum or diethyl aluminum chloride and allows a control over the stereoselectivity of the compound. Another advantage of this technique lies within the usage of water as a co-catalyst in PPA synthesis which is deemed impossible in other polymerization methods. Professor Hisaya Tani from the Department of Polymer Science at Osaka University was the first to report a stereospecific polymerization of o-phthalaldehyde by employing dimeric dimethylaluminumoxybenzylideneaniline [Me_{2}AlOCMeNPh]_{2} as catalyst and water as a co-catalyst. He was able to synthesize a fibrous PPA in exclusively trans-configuration which had never been reported before. Nonetheless, due to the inability to endcap the polymer with functional groups, this technique is rarely utilized at present and the mechanism of formation of PPA remains ambiguous and not well studied.

== Types of poly(phthalaldehyde) ==
Depending on the polymerization technique applied, two different types of poly(phthalaldehyde) can be acquired, linear and cyclic.

=== Linear PPA ===
Linear PPA is produced by anionic polymerization methods using a strong nucleophile as an initiator. This technique prevents the cyclization of the polymer chain as the propagating species have only one charged terminus that cannot backbite the other terminus which, in turn, is neutral in charge. Although processing linear PPA requires highly sensitive reaction conditions and is more time demanding, this type of polymer has many advantages over its cyclic counterpart. For instance, a control over the polymer's molar mass can easily be achieved by controlling the monomer and alcohol initiator ratios. Furthermore, it has been proven to be more thermally stable than its cyclic counterpart due to the presence of functionalized endcaps that stabilizes the polymer chain from depolymerization. For these reasons, it has been studied to a far greater extent than cyclic PPA. Various linear PPA with distinct end groups have been reported and studied for a variety of applications including sensing, drug delivery, and lithography. For instance, once these end groups are cleaved as a response to the exposure of PPA to a specific stimulus, the polymer will sequentially disassemble from head to tail through an unzipping reaction to form the monomer in short times that can be as low as a few minutes.

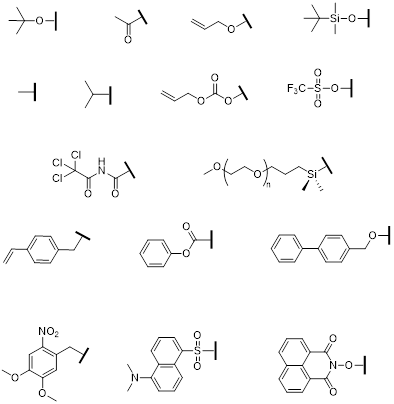
Structures of the different endcaps used in the synthesis of PPA

=== Cyclic PPA ===
Cyclic PPA is obtained through a cationic polymerization of o-phthalaldehyde using a Lewis acid, typically Boron trifluoride etherate, as an initiator. When Aso and Tagami first reported the successful synthesis of PPA using this technique in 1967, they were unaware of the fact that the polymer they prepared was cyclic and instead reported the structure as linear in their research paper. It was not until 2013 that polymer chemists proved that the structure is cyclic using a combination of characterization techniques including Nuclear Magnetic Resonance (NMR), Fourier Transform Infrared Spectroscopy (FT-IR), Gel Permeation Chromatography (GPC), and Mass Spectrometry (MS). Cyclic PPA is easy to synthesize; it is reported by Prof. Jeffrey Moore that the cationic polymerization of o-phthalaldehyde is very fast, yielding cyclic PPA within few minutes. Furthermore, the polymer can be isolated without the addition of pyridine nor methanol nor a strong base terminator, which in general makes this polymerization technique easy, fast, and cheap. Nevertheless, a known issue of this technique is the fact that the molecular weight cannot be controlled based on the initial concentration of the monomer used, which has led typically to cyclic PPA with a wide variety of molecular weights ranging between 3 kDa to 100 kDa using the same starting conditions. Furthermore, because of its cyclic structure, no end caps are used or needed. The absence of functionalized end caps in the structure has limited the usage of cyclic PPA especially in stimuli responsive applications.

== Properties and characteristics ==
PPA is a metastable polymer known for its ease of synthesis and rapid depolymerization. In addition, its properties can be easily influenced and manipulated upon either functionalizing the phthalaldehyde monomer with different groups, most efficiently, electron withdrawing groups, or employing different functional groups as end caps.^{3}

=== Mechanical properties ===
PPA is known to have a rigid and brittle backbone which limits its flexibility and usage in some applications. However, it can be easily tuned by adding additives rendering it a soft material. The mechanical properties of cyclic PPA films drop cast using different solvents have recently been investigated. The study showed the polymer to possess a large elastic modulus of 2.5-3 GPa which was also previously reported in another study, in addition to tensile strength values ranging between 25 and 35 MPa and a failure strain of 1-1.5% that is highly dependent of the solvent used.

==== Plasticizers as additives ====
With the insurgence in the usage of PPA during the past few years for various applications, the need to ameliorate the transient properties and enhance the mechanical features of this polymer has come to surface. PPA is known to be brittle; it possesses a large storage modulus, and a glass transition temperature that is above its thermal degradation point, which renders the polymer unsuitable for a broad range of applications. One way to ameliorate its intrinsic properties is via the addition of a plasticizing agent that can disrupt the polymer's intermolecular packing, and thus making it more flexible, decreasing its storage modulus, depressing its glass transition temperature, and increasing its shear strength. A few examples of plasticizers that have been used with PPA include dimethyl phthalate, bis(2-ethylhexyl) phthalate, diethyl adipate, and tri-isononyl trimellitate (TINTM). In a recent study, the effect of two ether-ester plasticizers on the mechanical flexibility and photo-transience speed of cyclic PPA was investigated. The authors were able to show that the addition of these additives broadened the storage modulus range and decreased it from 2300 MPa in the case of pure PPA down to 19 MPa in the PPA/plasticizer mixture, hence making the polymer more flexible and in need of less energy to be distorted. In another study published by the same research group, the effect of diethyl adipate (DEA) plasticizer on the glass transition temperature of cyclic PPA was investigated. After determining the glass transition temperature of pure PPA to be 187 °C, PPA films with various DEA concentrations were prepared. By varying DEA concentration, the authors were able depress T_{g} to 12.5 °C demonstrating the importance of plasticizers in enhancing the mechanical flexibility and thermal properties of PPA. Similar results were previously observed where the thermal transitions were depressed from 95 °C for cPPA to 24 °C for diethyl phthalate (DEP)-plasticized cPPA. Among the few studies that have been reported on the usage of plasticizers with PPA, it has been noted that the usage of plasticizers results in a decrease in the tensile stress of the polymers which indicate that PPA is becoming more flexible and hence the film can fold more easily. Nevertheless, a control on the amount of plasticizer used is important. For instance, in the study discussed above, it has been reported that the usage of a large amount of plasticizer (more than 50% w/w in comparison with PPA polymer) results in phase segregation and a decrease in the flexibility of the PPA film. Furthermore, the nature of the used solvent can highly affect the mechanical properties of PPA as well. In particular, in another study published in 2019, both the elastic modulus and tensile strength increase when dichloromethane was used as a solvent to drop-cast PPA in comparison to dioxane and chloroform.

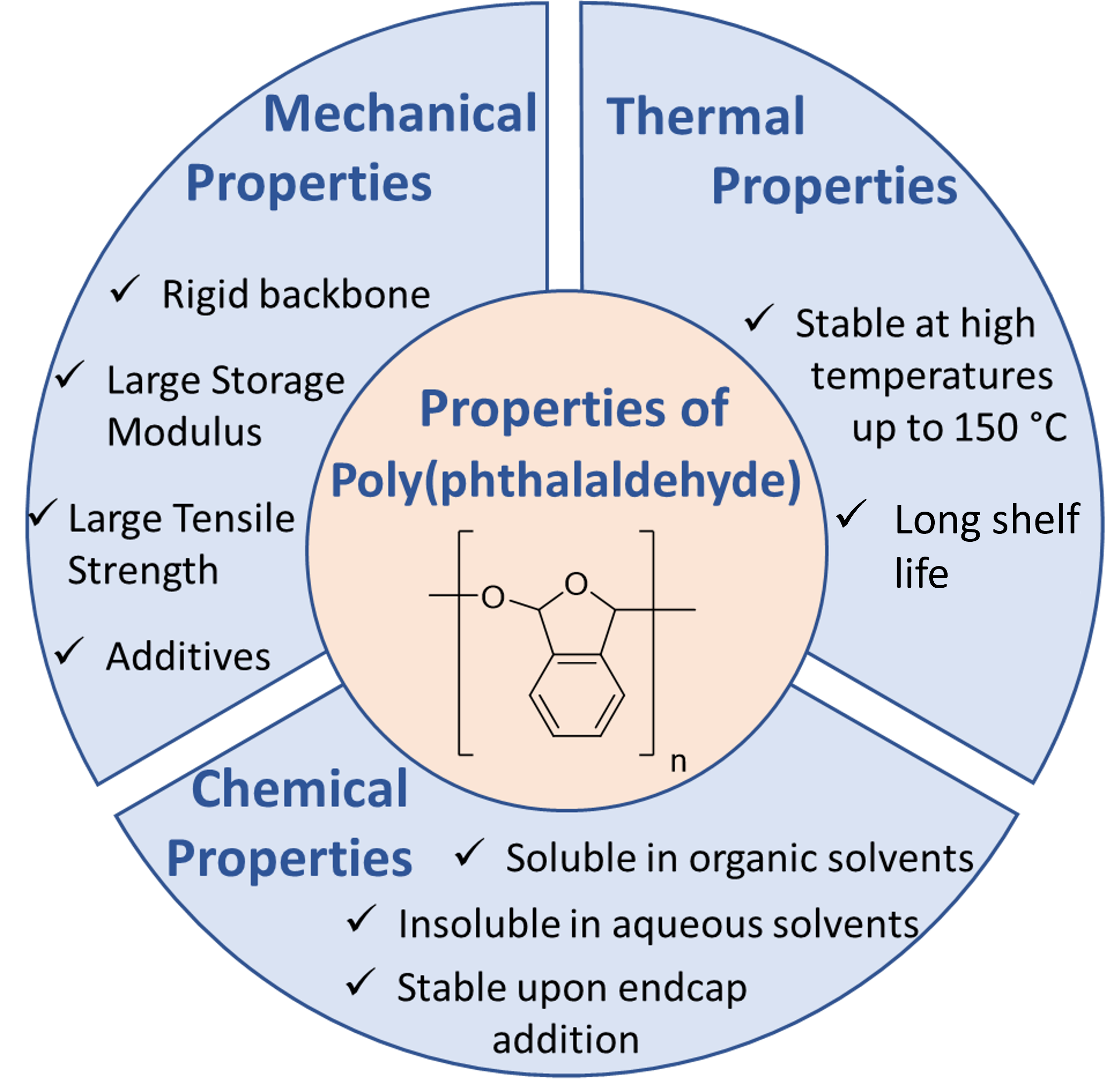
Unique properties of PPA

=== Thermal properties ===
The thermal stability of PPA is highly dependent on whether the polymer is end-capped or isolated without end groups. Cyclic PPA, in addition to functionalized linear PPA chains are known to be thermally stable for up to 150 °C as determined by both Differential Scanning Calorimetry (DSC) and Thermogravimetric Analysis (TGA). Moreover, the polymer is known for its long-term shelf life wherein it can be stored at room-temperature for a significant amount of time. Various chemists have studied substitution effects on the thermal stability of PPA. For instance, scientists at The International Business Machines Corporation (IBM) concluded, after extensive studies, that o-phthalaldehyde monomers functionalized with chloro, bromo, and 4-trimethylsilyl functional groups result in highly stable PPA compared to the unsubstituted polymer. Similarly, Phillips et al. proved that the substituted and end-capped poly(4,5-dichlorophthalaldehyde) possesses higher thermal degradation temperatures than its unsubstituted counterparts.

=== Chemical properties ===
By means of controlling the identity and reactivity of the endcaps, PPA can withstand harsh chemical conditions with no significant changes in its structure. For instance, while functionalizing PPA with an allyl acetate and tert-butyldimethylsilyl ether functional groups can lead to its rapid depolymerization in the presence of Pd(0) and F^{−} respectively, a simple change in the nature of the endcaps will preserve the chain even in the presence of both corrosive agents. On a separate note, while PPA is insoluble in aqueous solvents and alcohols, it is highly soluble in organic solvents such as THF, DCM, and DMSO where it can be dissolved for days without triggering depolymerization.

== Applications ==
Due to its stability, chemical properties, tunability, and reactivity, PPA has been employed in a variety of applications.

=== Photoresist ===
The high solubility and stability of PPA in organic solvents have allowed its investigation as a base material in first generation amplified photoresist for lithography in the early 80s by three scientists, Grant Willson, Jean Fréchet, and Hiroshi Ito who were working at IBM at the time. The story of how this successful achievement started and progressed can be found in the review paper written by Hiroshi Ito. Because PPA by itself does not undergo complete depolymerization upon its subjection to light, it is usually end-capped or used along photoacid generators (PAGs) for enhanced sensitivity. In this case, depolymerization is triggered upon irradiation either by end-cap removal and self-immolation or by the generated acid. Ober et al. stated that the use of PPA as photoresist under extreme ultraviolet (EUV) irradiation is yet to be successful due to the instability of PPA and the volatility of its monomers.^{30} However, they were able to report one of the first PPA derivatives without the use of PAGs with enhanced photoresist properties upon EUV exposure.^{19}

=== Drug release ===
Owing to its high reactivity and the ability to tune its endcap groups, PPA has been lately utilized in drug delivery applications. In one recent study, UV-sensitive PPA microcapsules containing different types of drugs were prepared. Once the capsules were subjected to a UV-light trigger, an unzipping reaction took place and the shell ruptured which led to the release of the core containing the microcapsules. A unique advantage of these microcapsules is that they allow the immediate release of the drug upon exposure to the trigger rather than its continuous release over a period of time ranging from minutes to hours as other common microcapsules function. In an earlier publication, DiLauro et al. reported the ability to predesign and control the thickness of the microcapsule shells and length of the PPA used to form the shell, which have stimuli-responsive endcaps allowing head-to-tail fluoride-triggered depolymerization.

=== Sensing through depolymerization ===
PPA is known as a self-immolative material which depolymerizes through endcap cleavage in response to a specific stimulus. For this reason, several PPA polymers with different endcaps have been synthesized and used as self-immolative materials for sensing toxic and specific compounds.

==== Acid-triggered depolymerization ====
Due to the presence of two types of oxygen atoms in the PPA backbone, in addition to the fact that H^{+} tends to protonate oxygen atoms easily, depolymerization can occur through both endcap cleavage and protonation of oxygen atoms present in the backbone. For this reason, polymer chemists tend to use endcaps rich in oxygen atoms to accelerate depolymerization rate. For example, Moore and co-workers reported the use of a specific ion coactivation (SICA) effect that allowed the ion and acid coactivated-triggered depolymerization of a cyclic PPA microcapsules at the solid/liquid interface of the polymer and solution.

==== Fluoride-triggered depolymerization ====
Silyl groups can be deprotected with fluoride ions resulting in a strong Si-F bond that is hard and challenging to break. For this reason, different polymer chemists started to employ PPA in fluoride sensing by using t-butyldimethylsilyl (TBS) containing initiators and terminators. The fluoride sensing ability of PPA has been previously used in applications such as drug release, as previously reported by DiLauro et al. Another application studied by Phillips and co-workers includes the use of fluoride-triggered PPA depolymerization in changing the structure of plastics in a predetermined way.

==== UV-light triggered depolymerization ====
To demonstrate its capability in rapidly depolymerizing in presence of UV-light, DiLauro et al. synthesized a PPA polymer with two UV-sensitive endcaps, 2-nitro-4,5-dimethoxybenzyl alcohol and 1-[[(chlorocarbonyl)oxy]methyl]-4,5-dimethoxy-2 nitrobenzene, and were able to achieve complete depolymerization in a few minutes. In a practical application in organic electronics, cyclic PPA in the presence of 2-(4-methoxystyryl)-4,6-bis(trichloromethyl)-1,3,5-triazine (MBTT used as PAG) undergoes depolymerization upon exposure to UV-light, which in turn deactivates the transient electronics. Another similar application in transient electronics was reported where an organic light-emitting diode (OLED) was integrated on the PPA substrate and can cause depolymerization in the presence of a PAG.

==== Pd(0)-triggered depolymerization ====
Apart from its usage in sensing acids and fluoride anions, PPA has been used in sensing Pd(0) metal by employing allyl chloroformate as a terminating end cap. This has been reported by Phillips and his research group, where they used an allyl formate endcap that stoichiometrically depolymerized within minutes upon its exposure to a catalytic amount of tetrakis(triphenylphosphine)palladium(0) (Pd(PPh_{3})_{4}).

== Health and safety ==
According to the safety data sheet of PPA, it should not be allowed in contact with the skin or eyes as it may lead to skin, eye, and respiratory irritations or allergic reactions. In addition, as some unfunctionalized PPA are unstable at temperatures even lower than room temperature, PPA should be stored at temperatures below -10 °C under inert atmosphere and away from sunlight, moisture, and heat, but with proper ventilation.

Since the depolymerization of PPA is greatly studied in its applications, it is important to also note the possible safety concerns of its monomer. In addition to the abovementioned hazards of PPA, phthalaldehyde is very toxic if swallowed and for aquatic life.
