= Star-shaped polymer =

Polymer structure with linear chains connected to a central core

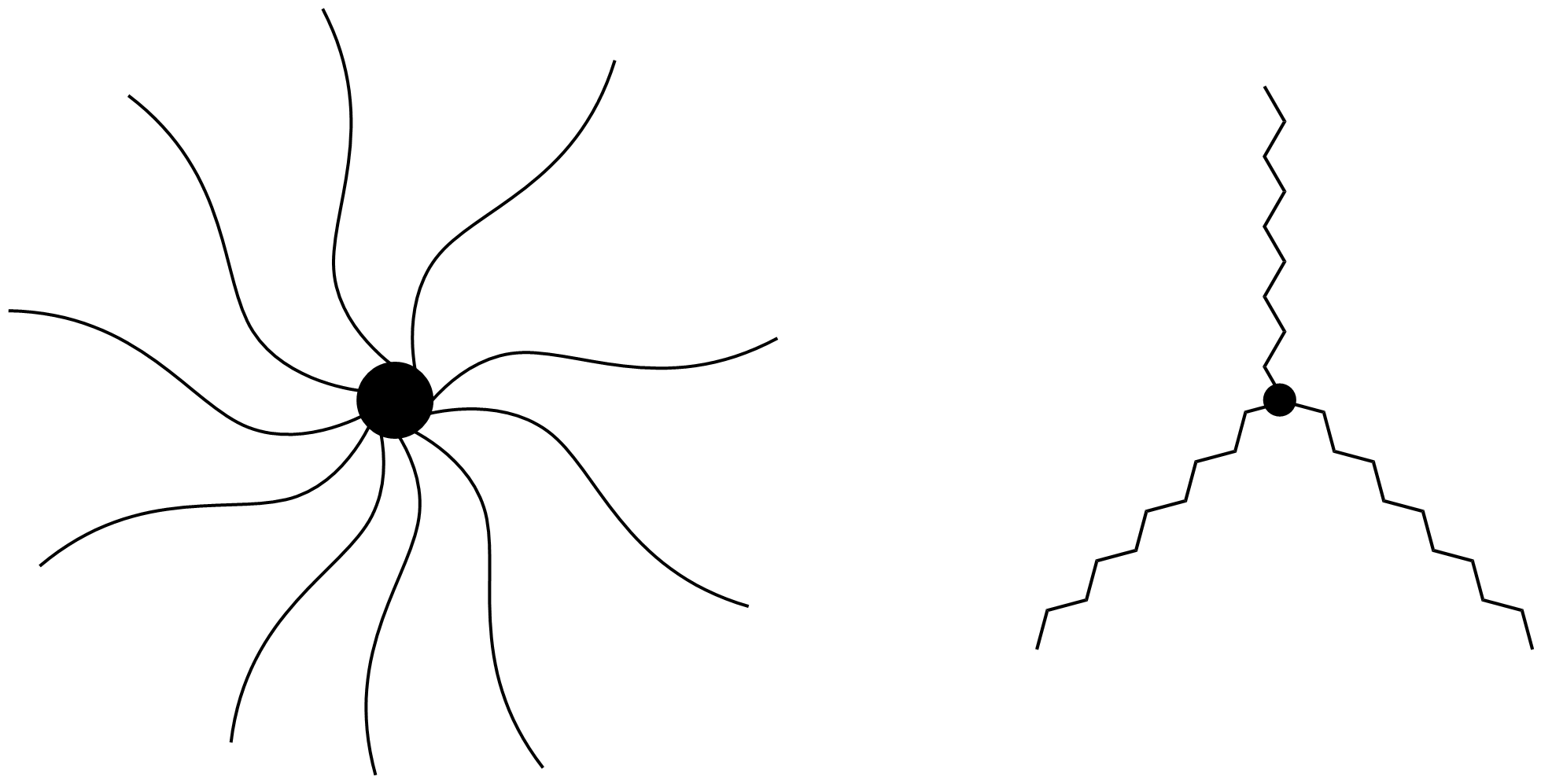
Representations of how star shaped polymers are typically shown

In polymer science, star-shaped polymers are the simplest class of branched polymers with a general structure consisting of several (at least three) linear chains connected to a central core. The core, or the center, of the polymer can be an atom, molecule, or macromolecule; the chains, or "arms", consist of variable-length organic chains. Star-shaped polymers in which the arms are all equivalent in length and structure are considered homogeneous, and ones with variable lengths and structures are considered heterogeneous.

Star-shaped polymers' shape and associated properties, such as their compact structure, high arm density, efficient synthetic routes, and unique rheological properties make them tools for use in drug delivery, other biomedical applications, thermoplastics, and nanoelectronics among others.

== History ==
Star-shaped polymers were first reported by John Schaefgen and Paul Flory in 1948 while studying multichain polymers; they synthesized star-shaped polyamides. The next major publication regarding star-shaped polymers was in 1962 by Maurice Morton et al. Their research presented the first study demonstrating a method to create well-defined star-shaped polymers; this route was through living anionic polymerization. Many studies on the characteristics, syntheses, and applications of star-shaped polymers have since been undertaken and remain an active area of study.

== Nomenclature ==
Recommendations on nomenclatures still differ widely across different regulatory bodies (IUPAC, CAS, MDL). According to IUPAC star-shaped polymers are designated by a star prefix which can be further specified as f-star when the number of arms f is known. An example would be star-(polyA; polyB; polyC) for a variegated (heteroarm) star polymer with three arm species, but an undefined number of arms and distribution of arms. When the number of arms and its distribution is known this can be designated as for example 6-star-(polyA(f3); polyB(f3)) where 6 arms exist in total whereof 3 consist of polyA polymer. Stars containing only one species (same chemistry and molar mass) of arms are called regular stars (also called homo-arm). Stars with more than one arm species are designated as variegated stars (hetero-arm).

== Properties ==
=== Structure ===
Star-shaped polymers consist of a multifunctional center from which at least three polymer chains (arms) radiate. These arms can be chemically identical (homostars) or different (heteroarm stars). Additionally, individual arms may be composed of multiple polymers, resulting in star-block polymers or star copolymers. The unique properties of star-shaped polymers come from their chemical structure as well as the length and number of their arms.

=== Dynamic and rheological properties ===
Some of the most interesting characteristics exhibited by star-shaped polymers are their unique rheological and dynamic properties compared to linear analogues of identical molecular weight and monomer composition. Generally, they have smaller hydrodynamic radii, radii of gyration and lower internal viscosities than linear analogues of the same molecular weight. Internal viscosity increases with increased functionality and molecular weight of branches with the effects of functionality eventually saturating, leaving viscosity dependent only on molecular weight of the arms. Heteroarm stars have observed viscosities and hydrodynamic radii higher than homostars. This is due to the increased repulsive interactions that occur as a result of a greater number of heterocontacts between the different arms. In addition, star-shaped polymers exhibit lower melting points, lower crystallization temperatures and lower degrees of crystallinity than comparable linear analogues.

=== Self-assembly ===
The unique self-assembly properties of star shaped polymers make them a promising field of research for use in applications such as drug delivery and multiphase processes such as separation of organic/inorganic materials. Generally, star-shaped polymers have higher critical micelle concentrations, and so lower aggregation numbers, than their analogous, similar molecular weight linear chains. The addition of functional groups to the arms of star-shaped polymers as well as selective solvent choice can affect their aggregation properties. Increasing the number of functional groups while retaining the same molecular weight decreases aggregation numbers. Heteroarm polymers have been shown to aggregate into particularly interesting supramolecular formations such as stars, segmented ribbons, and core-shell-corona micellar assemblies depending on their arms' solubility in solution, which can be affected by changes in temperature, pH, solvent, etc. These self-assembly properties have implications for solubility of the whole star polymers themselves and for other solutes in solution. For Heteroarm polymers, increasing the molecular weight of soluble chains increases the overall solubility of the star. Certain Heteroarm star-block polymers have been shown to stabilize water-organic solvent emulsions, while others have demonstrated the ability to increase the solubility of inorganic salts in organic solutions.

== Syntheses ==
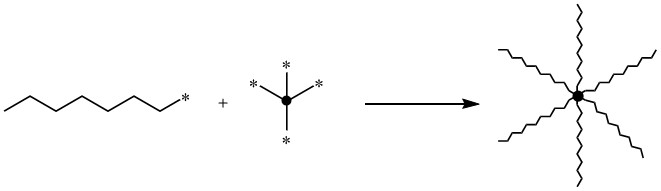
Generalized arm-first synthesis approach. The * symbols represent active functionalities

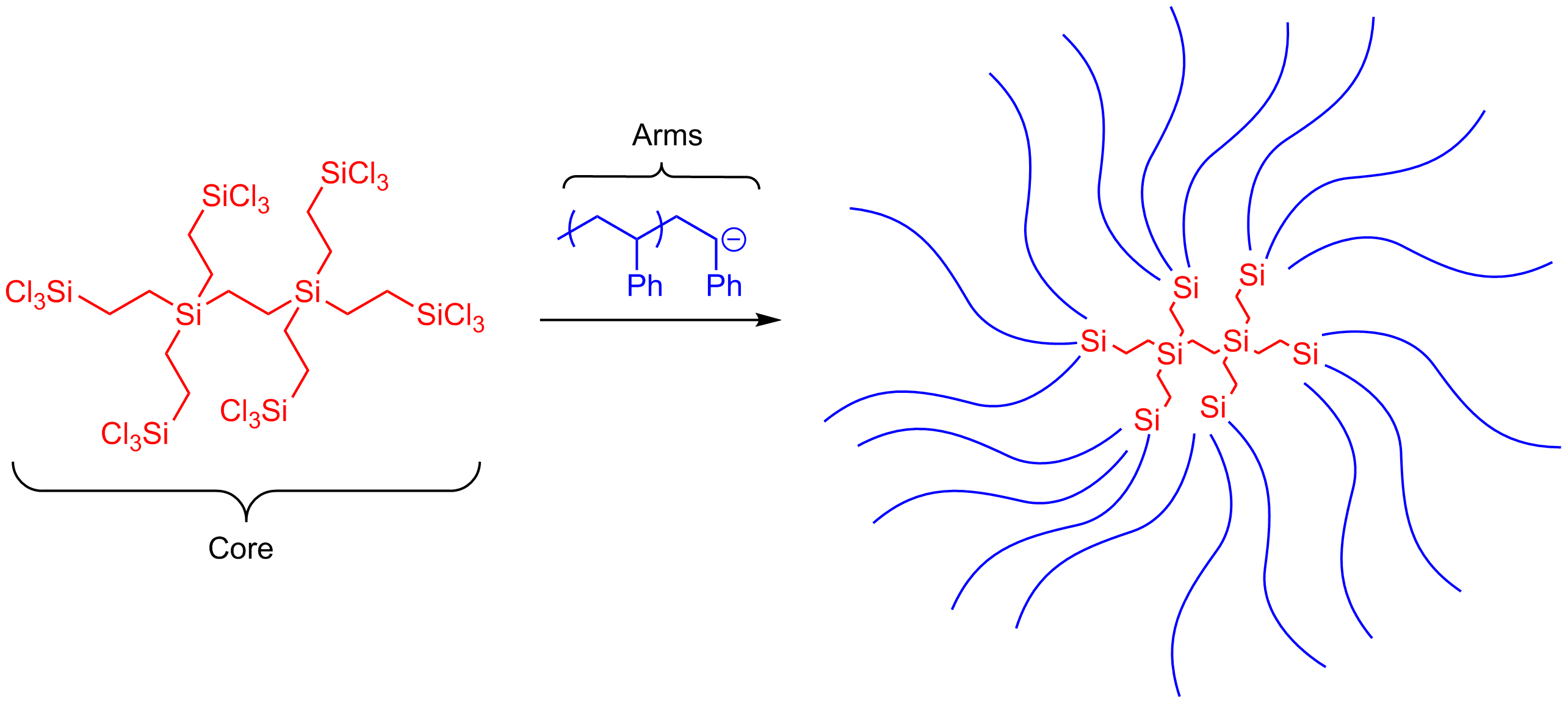
Arm-first synthesis using a chlorosilane derivative core and anionic monomer arms

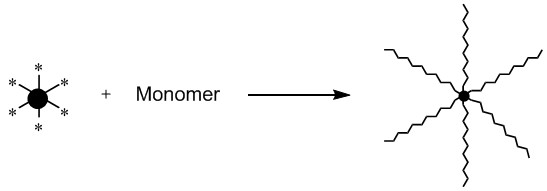
Generalized core-first synthesis approach. The * symbols represent active functionalities

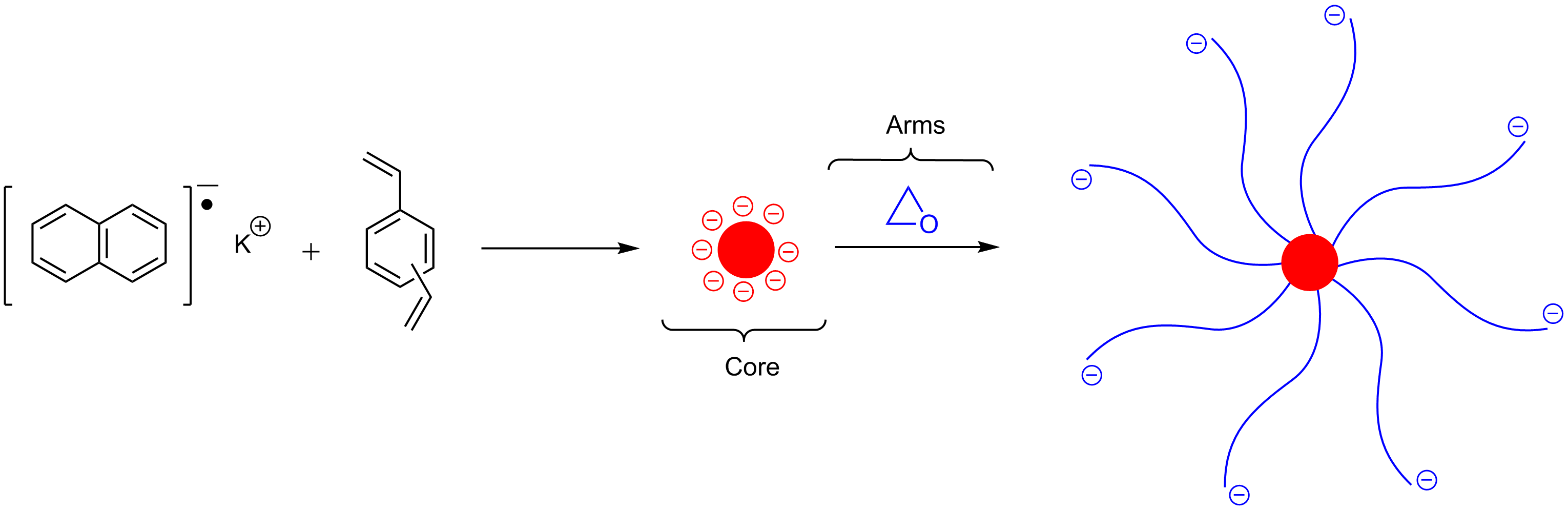
Core-first synthetic approach to PEO star-shaped polymers, including DVB functionalization

Star-shaped polymers can be synthesized through various approaches. The most common syntheses include an arm-first approach, in which the living chains are used as the initiators, and a core-first approach, in which the core is used as the initiator.

Other synthetic routes include: controlled sol-gel processes, group transfer polymerization, transition metal catalysis, living anionic polymerization, living cationic polymerization, ring opening polymerization, ring-opening metathesis polymerization (ROMP), and controlled radical polymerization.

=== Arm-first ===
In the arm-first (also known as the "arm-in" or convergent approach) method, monofunctional living polymers with known characteristics are used as precursors in the reaction. The active site at the end of their chain can be directly reacted with an appropriately reactive multifunctional polymer core (also known as a linking agent) to produce a star-shaped polymer. In this approach the resulting star-polymer consists of homogeneous chain groups. The arm-first synthesis route is arguably the most efficient synthesis of star-shaped polymers. This is because each step can be directly controlled and assessed; the arms and core can be isolated and characterized prior to a stoichiometric reaction, and the functionality of the final star-polymer can then be accurately and directly measured.

One common approach to the arm-first synthesis is through anionic polymerization methods. This involves using "arms" that are anionic and reacting them with a core containing deactivating groups for the arms to react with. The deactivating groups on the core are often chlorosilanes, chlorine leaving groups, or deactivating alkenes. Chlorosilanes serve as especially reactive cores, and can react quantitatively (or very close to quantitatively) with carbanion living polymers; this reaction involves carbanions performing electrophilic substitution with the Si-Cl groups (as shown in the below figure). In a case like this, the resulting arms are all homogeneous and can be well characterized, and the core can also be well characterized, leading to a well-characterized star-shaped polymer. Since both the core and the arms are rather reactive, essentially all Si-Cl undergo electrophilic substitution, and the resulting star-shaped polymers thus have a rather narrow polydispersity index.

=== Core-first ===
In the core-first approach (also known as the "arm-out" or divergent approach), a multifunctional core serves as the initiator simultaneously for several arms. This approach proves to be more complicated than the arm-first approach, in that finding an appropriate and stable core is difficult, and characterizing the synthesized star-polymer is challenging.

The core-first route was first approached in 1988 through functionalizing DVB using potassium naphthalenide to create a multifunctional core. The core can than be reacted with ethylene oxide to create a star-shaped polymer. As is typical of most core-first approaches, this scheme had issues with high viscosity and gelation. The star-shaped polymer was characterized by size-exclusion chromatography and light scattering techniques.

== Applications ==
While many studies have been published regarding star-shaped polymers, their commercial applications are limited, but growing constantly as research expands. Some commercial applications of star-shaped polymers include:

- Asymmetrical star-shaped polymers have been found to be effective thermoplastic elastomers. Their morphologies contribute favorably to mechanical properties such as toughness, stretch recovery, transparency, and thermostability.
- Use as viscosity index improvers in car engine lubricating oils. Star-shaped polymers generally have lower internal viscosities than their linear analogues due to their smaller hydrodynamic radii and radii of gyration. This makes them favorable for use in fluids that require low viscosity such as lubricating oils in car engines.
- The architecture of photoresists has typically been dominated by linear polymers. Star-shaped polymers, however, have been shown to display more advantageous properties when compared to their linear analogues. They are able to decrease roughness of photoresist sidewalls without a decrease in sensitivity or resolution. This is due to star-shaped polymers' decreased tendency to form chain entanglements relative to their linear analogues of similar molecular weights, which leads to insolubility and increased roughness.
- Miktoarm polymers that form core-shell-corona micellar structures have been seen to uptake and release small molecules in different biological conditions. Small molecules associate with certain polymer arms that form the interior of the micellar structure during transport. When they are exposed to conditions that cause the interior arms to become solvated, the small molecules are released. Specifically, successful encapsulation of the anti-cancer agent doxorubicin hydrochloride has been achieved.
- The low gelation concentration of telechelic and semitelechelic star-shaped polymers has made them useful in the development of new hydrogels for biomaterial applications. This low gelation concentration is caused by an increased number of intermolecular interactions relative to linear analogues due to star-shaped polymers' increased number of functional groups in a given volume.
- Polyoxazoline star polymers have been investigated for their potential uses in drug delivery.
