= Jephcott =

Jephcott is a surname. Notable people with the surname include:

- Alfred Jephcott (1853–1932), English trade unionist and politician
- Sir Harry Jephcott (1891–1978), English pharmaceutical industrialist
- Avun Jephcott (born 1983), English footballer
- Claude Jephcott, English footballer
- Dominic Jephcott (born 1957), English actor

== See also ==
- Jephcott Baronets
