= Dainton Report =

1968 British government report

The Dainton Report was a 1968 British government report on secondary schools in the UK, also known as The Swing away from Science.

== History ==
The report was produced in March 1968 by Frederick Dainton, Baron Dainton FRS, who was the Vice-Chancellor of the University of Nottingham. In October 1966 there were 1,600 vacant places in the science and technology faculties of British universities. Sheffield-born Fred Dainton was a Professor of Chemistry for fifteen years, researching radiation chemistry, and was later knighted in 1971. He died in December 1997.

The report was published by the Dainton Committee of the Department for Education and Science. The Dainton Committee was formed in 1965 by the Council for Scientific Policy.

== Content ==
The report found that there was a reduction in the numbers of people entering science and engineering at university. The report was also known as the Enquiry into the Flow of Candidates in Science and Technology into Higher Education.

Around 40,000 of those at sixth-form were studying science in 1964; he predicted this would lower to around 30,000 in 1971, when the total numbers in sixth-form would rise from 107,000 to 130,000. One fifth of those taking science at sixth-form were female. In 1962 around 42% were opting for science at school, but by 1967 it was 31%; it was predicted this would lower to 25% by 1971. 45.9% of university admissions were to science courses, which had lowered to 40.6% in 1967. At the same time, those opting to study social sciences at university was rapidly increasing, doubling in proportion from 1962 to 1967.

The report wanted to improve the position of science, technology, and engineering in the education system, and society. The report wanted to increase the supply of scientists and technologists, which the report claimed, was limited by the immature and misinformed choices of 13 and 14 year olds at school, making premature decisions, often unfavourable to a career in science or technology. The report claimed that fewer people were choosing science, because of schools making 13 or 14 year olds decide between either arts or sciences. The report wanted to create less irrevocable decisions at school, where science was not part of that decision. 14 year olds were deciding not to study science, which was largely irrevocable. The report had found that heavy factual content of science courses had deterred 14 year olds from choosing science. The cut-off point of studying science for many at school was the age of 14.

=== Recommendations ===
- All should study Mathematics until the end of secondary school, and should study arts and sciences.
- Those in the sixth form should study five subjects, not just two or three. The five subjects should include Mathematics, a science, a social study and a language.
- University entrance should be based on five subjects, not three.
- Universities should not know the individual A-level results of each candidate, but receive a grade as a whole for all the examinations taken - an overall grade.
- Universities should provide refresher courses for teachers in the latest know-how, and should not wait for teachers to come to them, but actively visit schools.
- Science teaching should contain less arid rote learning and dreary experiments, and should be more relevant to human experience.
- Mathematics should be seen as not only preparation for becoming a scientist, but for application in other walks of life, such as decision making and with organisation.

== Effect ==
The Schools Council had also recommended to universities that entrance should be two GCE A-level passes, with four elective courses chosen by individual schools. Universities were asked to reply to the report later in 1968.

== See also ==
- Education in England
- Making Mathematics Count
- Secondary education in Scotland
- Science and Technology Select Committee
