= 3-Deoxy-2-octulosonidase =

Class of enzymes

Identifiers
- EC no.: 3.2.1.124
- CAS no.: 103171-48-8

Databases
- IntEnz: IntEnz view
- BRENDA: BRENDA entry
- ExPASy: NiceZyme view
- KEGG: KEGG entry
- MetaCyc: metabolic pathway
- PRIAM: profile
- PDB structures: RCSB PDB PDBe PDBsum
Search
- PMC: articles
- PubMed: articles
- NCBI: proteins

3-Deoxy-2-octulosonidase (EC 3.2.1.124, 2-keto-3-deoxyoctonate hydrolase, octulosylono hydrolase, octulofuranosylono hydrolase, octulopyranosylonohydrolase) is an enzyme with systematic name capsular-polysaccharide 3-deoxy-D-manno-2-octulosonohydrolase. This enzyme catalyses the following chemical reaction

Endohydrolysis of the β-ketopyranosidic linkages of 3-deoxy-D-manno-2-octulosonate in capsular polysaccharides

The bacteriophage enzyme depolymerizes polysaccharides containing 3-deoxy-2-octulosonide in the cell wall of Escherichia coli.
