= Frederick Dainton, Baron Dainton =

British chemist and university administrator

The Right Honourable The Lord Dainton Kt FRS FRSE
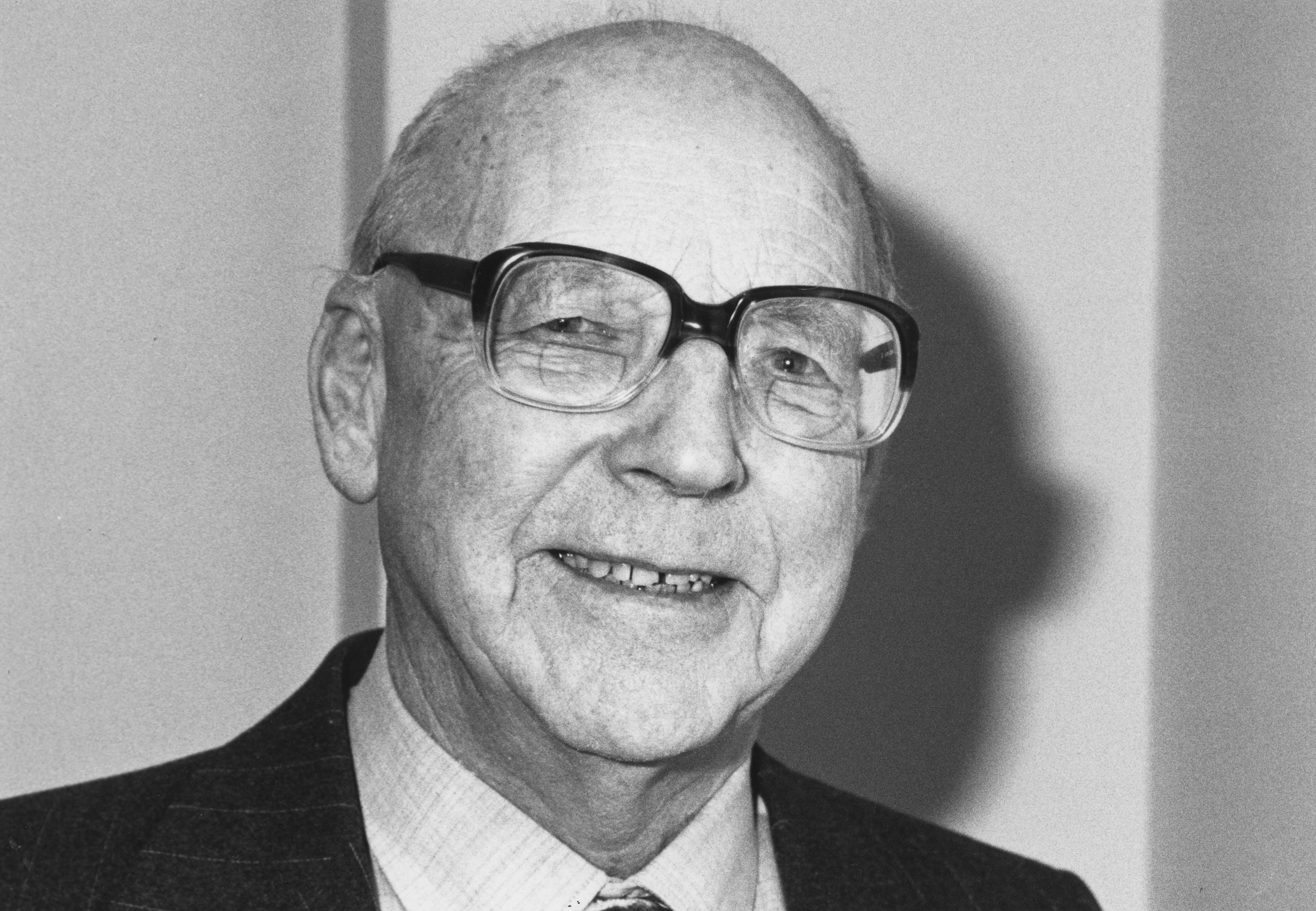
- Dainton, 1990s

Member of the House of Lords
- In office 1986–1997

Frederick Sydney Dainton, Baron Dainton, Kt, FRS, FRSE (11 November 1914 – 5 December 1997) was a British academic chemist and university administrator.

A graduate of Oxford and Cambridge, he was successively Professor of Physical Chemistry at the University of Leeds, Vice-Chancellor of the University of Nottingham, Dr Lee's Professor of Chemistry at Oxford and Chancellor of the University of Sheffield.

== Early life and education ==
Dainton was born in Sheffield on 11 November 1914, the son of George Whalley Dainton (born 1857), a Clerk of Works to a building contractor, and his second wife Mary Jane Bottrill, as the youngest of nine children. He obtained a scholarship to the Central Secondary School in Sheffield, but it was in the public library that he became enthused of chemistry by reading the books of Sidgwick and Hinshelwood.

Dainton won an Exhibition at St John's College, Oxford with a supplementary grant and loan from the City of Sheffield, which enabled him to study chemistry, gaining a first class degree in 1937. He then moved to Sidney Sussex College, Cambridge where he received his PhD in 1940 working on photochemistry under Ronald Norrish, FRS.

== Academic career ==
Being short-sighted Dainton was unfit for military service and stayed to teach at Cambridge during the Second World War. In 1945 he became a Fellow of St Catharine's College, Cambridge.

In polymer chemistry he explained the thermodynamics of the ceiling temperature of depolymerizable polymers in 1948.

In 1950 Dainton was appointed Professor of Physical Chemistry at the University of Leeds, specialising in radiation chemistry; work which resulted in his election as a Fellow of the Royal Society.

In 1965 Dainton left Leeds to become Vice-Chancellor of the University of Nottingham. During this period he chaired a Government enquiry into the decline in university entrants in science and technology, published in 1968 as The Swing away from Science and generally known as the Dainton Report.

In 1970 Dainton was appointed Dr Lee's Professor of Chemistry and a Fellow of Exeter College, Oxford, moving on in 1973 to become Chairman of the University Grants Committee where he remained until 1985. In 1970 he also became the second chairman of the Council for Scientific Policy.

From 1978 until his death Dainton was Chancellor of the University of Sheffield, the first Yorkshireman to hold the post.

== Honours ==
Dainton was elected a Fellow of the Royal Society (FRS) in 1957 and in 1996 he was elected an Honorary Fellow of the Royal Society of Edinburgh (FRSE). In 1972, he was elected to the American Academy of Arts and Sciences. He was elected to the American Philosophical Society in 1991.

Dainton was awarded the Davy Medal in 1969 and the Faraday Medal in 1974. He was awarded the inaugural President's Medal of the Institute of Physics in 1998.

He was awarded the honorary degree of Doctor of Science (DSc) by the University of Bath in 1970.

Dainton was knighted in 1971 and received a life peerage as Baron Dainton, of Hallam Moors in South Yorkshire on 14 February 1986.

== Marriage and children ==
Whilst at Cambridge Dainton met (and in 1942 married) a zoology research student, Barbara Hazlitt Wright (died 12 April 2009). They were married for 55 years and had a son and two daughters.

== Death ==
Lord Dainton died in Oxford on 5 December 1997 at the age of 83.

== Selected publications ==
- Science: Salvation or Damnation (1971)
- Doubts and Certainties: A Personal Memoir of the 20th Century (2000)

Academic offices
Preceded by Bertrand Hallward	Vice-Chancellor of the University of Nottingham; 1965–1970	Succeeded by John Butterfield
Preceded by Rab Butler	Chancellor of the University of Sheffield; 1978–1997	Succeeded by Peter Middleton
