= Harry Jephcott =

British pharmaceutical industrialist

Sir Harry Jephcott 1st Baronet
- Born: 15 January 1891; Tardebigge, England
- Died: 29 May 1978 (aged 87); Harrow, London
- Education: University of London, BS in chemistry (1915), MS (1918)
- Occupation: Pharmaceutical industrialist
- Known for: Work at Glaxo
- Spouse: Doris Gregory (m. 1919)
- Children: 2

Sir Harry Jephcott, 1st Baronet (15 January 1891 – 29 May 1978) was a British pharmaceutical industrialist.

== Education ==
Harry Jephcott was educated at King Edward VI Camp Hill, a grammar school in Birmingham. In 1907, he was apprenticed to a pharmacist in Redditch. He joined Customs and Excise in 1912 and was seconded to the department of the government chemist in 1914. Meanwhile, he studied part-time at West Ham Technical Institute and in 1915 graduated with a first class Bachelor of Science in chemistry at the University of London. He gained the diploma of pharmaceutical chemist in 1916, took a master's degree in 1918 with a thesis on tobacco. He was elected to be a Fellow of the Royal Institute of Chemistry in 1920.

== Career ==
In 1919, Jephcott was recruited by Alec Nathan to the family business, Joseph Nathan & Co., which sold dried milk powder imported from New Zealand, under the trade name of Glaxo. Jephcott worked on quality control. In 1923 visited the US to meet other scientists. He obtained a licence to fortify Glaxo powder with antirachitic vitamin D, using Theodore Zucker's process for the extraction of the vitamin from fish-liver oil. In 1924, he instigated Glaxo to start production of its first pharmaceutical product, Ostelin. This was the earliest commercially-made vitamin concentrate in Great Britain.

Jephcott was cognitive of new scientific ideas, had an interest in pharmaceutical sales, and was a good business strategist who understood company administration as well. His understanding of patent law with respect to pharmaceuticals led him to study for the bar and to be called to the Middle Temple in 1925. He was promoted to be general manager of the Glaxo department in 1925, a director of Joseph Nathan in 1929, managing director of the newly formed Glaxo Laboratories (GL) in 1935, and of the parent company in 1939.

During World War II, Jephcott was adviser on manufactured foods to the Ministry of Food (1941–43) and chairman of the Therapeutic Research Corporation in 1943. He visited the US on behalf of the Ministry of Supply in 1944 to report on penicillin production, which helped enable Glaxo Laboratories to build factories for penicillin production by deep fermentation under licence from two American companies, Merck & Co. and Squibb. This established his company as a major force in the British pharmaceutical industry. By 1995, it became the largest pharmaceutical group in the world.

Harry Jephcott organised the public flotation of Glaxo Laboratories in 1947. He retired as managing director in 1956. However, as non-executive chairman was largely responsible when his company took control of other pharmaceutical businesses, for example Allen & Hanburys in 1958. From 1963, he was appointed honorary life president.

== Positions and honours ==
Jephcott was a member of the UK government's Advisory Council on Scientific Policy (1953–56) and chairman of the Council for Scientific and Industrial Research (1956–61). He was a director of the Metal Box Company (1950–64). He was chairman and then president of the Association of British Chemical Manufacturers (1947–55), president of the Royal Institute of Chemistry (1953–55), and a governor of the London School of Economics (1952–68).

Jephcott was knighted in 1946 and created a baronet in 1962.

== Personal life ==
Harry Jephcott was born at Tardebigge, near Redditch, Worcestershire, England. He was the youngest of five children (three of them sons). His father was John Josiah Jephcott (1853–1929), train driver and former miner. His mother was Helen (1849–1930), daughter of Charles Matthews. Jephcott married his wife Doris (1893–1985), daughter of Henry Gregory, a builder, on 19 April 1919. She was a pharmaceutical chemist before her marriage. They had two sons. Jephcott lived from 1928 until his death in Pinner, Middlesex. He also bought farms at East Portlemouth in Devon.

Jephcott founded the Jephcott Charitable Trust in 1965. This provides funding for education, health, the natural environment, and population control. He donated 35 acres (140,000 m^{2}) of coastline to the National Trust.

Harry Jephcott died of heart failure at Northwick Park Hospital, Harrow, west London.

== See also ==
- Jephcott Baronets

Baronetage of the United Kingdom
New creation	Baronet (of East Portlemouth); 1962–1978	Succeeded by Anthony Jephcott
