= Depolymerizable polymers =

Polymeric materials that can be reverted to monomers

Depolymerizable polymers or Low-Ceiling Temperature Polymers refer to polymeric materials that can undergo depolymerization to revert the materials to their monomers at relatively low temperatures, such as room temperature. For example, the ceiling temperature T_{c} for formaldehyde is 119 °C, and that for acetaldehyde is -39 °C.

Unlike stable polymers such as PVCs that have high thermal stability, depolymerizable polymers and closely related self-immolative polymers can be triggered by stimuli to break fast under moderate to low temperatures. The first type of polymers, poly (olefin sulfone), was reported by Snow and Frey in 1943. It was further confirmed and explained in terms of the thermodynamics of a reversible propagation step by Dainton and Ivin. Closely related to depolymerizable polymers, self-immolative polymers can also irreversibly disassemble into their constituent parts in response to stimuli such as temperature, biological inputs or pH.

== Aspirational applications ==
Demand for recycling has also prompted search for polymers that are transient. For example, poly(phthalaldehyde) is a possible photodegradable substrate material for circuits. Other applications include controlled release of small molecules, and as stimuli-responsive photoresists for lithography. Some polymers are contemplated for controlled release of drugs.
