= Phthalaldehyde =

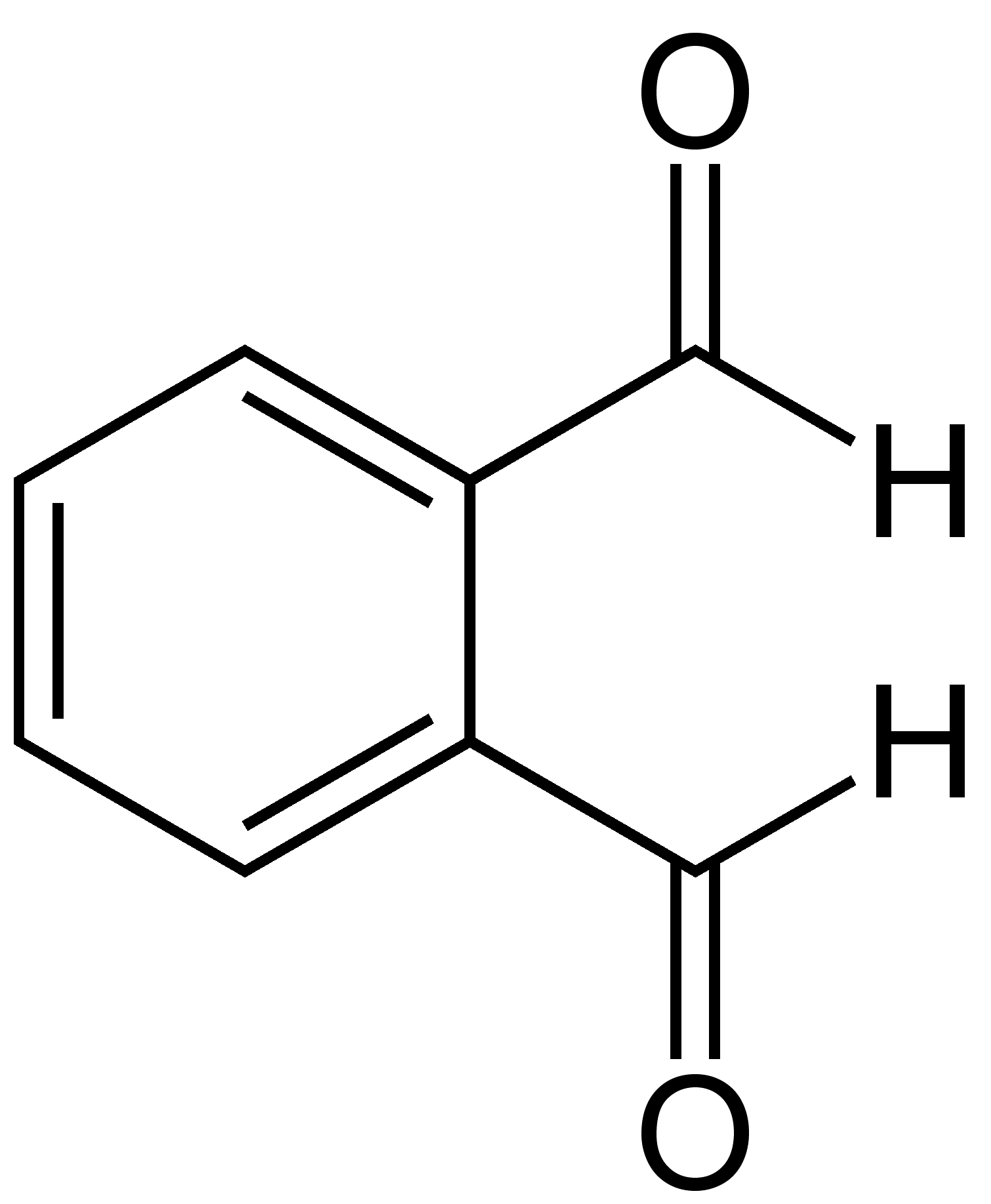
- Skeletal formula of o-phthaldehyde

Names
- IUPAC name Phthalaldehyde
- Preferred IUPAC name Benzene-1,2-dicarbaldehyde
- Other names Benzene-1,2-dicarboxaldehyde o-Phthalaldehyde o-Phthalic dicarboxaldehyde Phthaldialdehyde

Identifiers
CAS Number	643-79-8
3D model (JSmol)	Interactive image
ChEBI	CHEBI:70851
ChemSpider	4642
ECHA InfoCard	100.010.367
EC Number	211-402-2
PubChem CID	4807
RTECS number	TH6950000
UNII	4P8QP9768A
UN number	2923
CompTox Dashboard (EPA)	DTXSID6032514
- InChI: InChI=1S/C8H6O2/c9-5-7-3-1-2-4-8(7)6-10/h1-6H
- SMILES: O=Cc1ccccc1C=O

Properties
Chemical formula	C_{8}H_{6}O_{2}
Molar mass	134.134 g·mol^{−1}
Appearance	Yellow solid
Density	1.19 g/mL
Melting point	55.5–56 °C (131.9–132.8 °F; 328.6–329.1 K)
Boiling point	266.1 °C (511.0 °F; 539.2 K)
Solubility in water	Low

Hazards
- Occupational safety and health (OHS/OSH)
Main hazards	Toxic, Irritant
- GHS labelling
Pictograms	(GHS02: Flammable) (GHS05: Corrosive) (GHS06: Toxic) (GHS07: Exclamation mark) (GHS08: Health hazard) (GHS09: Environmental hazard)
Signal word	Danger
Hazard statements	H228, H301, H314, H315, H317, H335, H373, H410
Precautionary statements	P210, P240, P241, P260, P264, P270, P271, P272, P273, P280, P301+P310, P301+P330+P331, P302+P352, P303+P361+P353, P304+P340, P305+P351+P338, P310, P312, P314, P321, P330, P332+P313, P333+P313, P362, P363, P370+P378, P391, P403+P233, P405, P501
Flash point	132 °C (270 °F; 405 K)
- Except where otherwise noted, data are given for materials in their standard state (at 25 °C [77 °F], 100 kPa). verify (what is ?) Infobox references

Phthalaldehyde (sometimes also o-phthalaldehyde or ortho-phthalaldehyde, OPA) is the chemical compound with the formula C_{6}H_{4}(CHO)_{2}. It is one of three isomers of benzene dicarbaldehyde, related to phthalic acid. This pale yellow solid is a building block in the synthesis of heterocyclic compounds and a reagent in the analysis of amino acids. OPA dissolves in water solution at pH < 11.5. Its solutions degrade upon UV illumination and exposure to air.

== Synthesis and reactions ==
The compound was first described in 1887 when it was prepared from α,α,α’,α’-tetrachloro-o-xylene. A more modern synthesis is similar: the hydrolysis of the related tetrabromo-o-xylene using potassium oxalate, followed by purification by steam distillation.

The reactivity of OPA is complicated by the fact that in water it forms both a mono- and dihydrate, C_{6}H_{4}(CHO)(CH(OH)_{2}) and C_{6}H_{4}(CH(OH))_{2}O, respectively. Its reactions with nucleophiles often involves the reaction of both carbonyl groups.

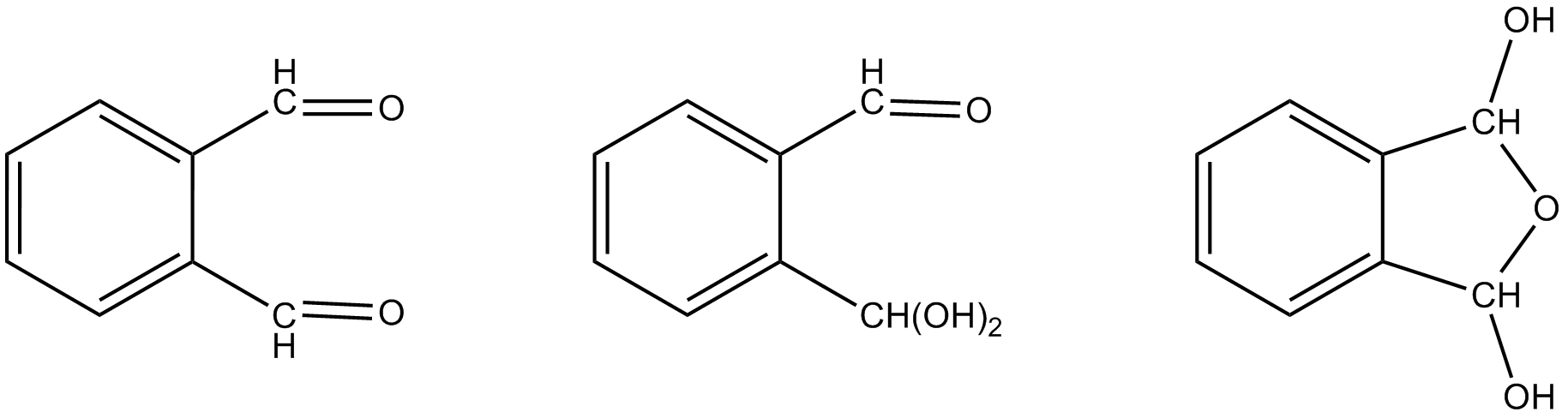

== Biochemistry ==
OPA is used in a very sensitive fluorogenic reagent for assaying amines or sulfhydryls in solution, notably contained in proteins, peptides, and amino acids, by capillary electrophoresis and chromatography. OPA reacts specifically with primary amines above their isoelectric point Pi in presence of thiols. The reaction produces isoindoles, which fluoresce. is the basis of an analytical method involving spectrometric (fluorescent emission at 436-475 nm (max 455 nm) with excitation at 330-390 nm (max. 340 nm)).

== Disinfection ==
OPA is commonly used as a high-level disinfectant for medical instruments, commonly sold under the brand names of Cidex OPA or TD-8. Disinfection with a High-level disinfectant such as OPA is indicated for semi-critical instruments that come into contact with mucous membranes or broken skin, such as specula, laryngeal mirrors, and internal ultrasound probes.

== Poly(phthalaldehyde) ==
OPA can be polymerized. In the polymer, one of the oxygen atoms forms a bridge to the other non-ring carbon of the same phthalaldehyde unit, while the other bridges to a non-ring carbon of another phthalaldehyde unit. Poly(phthalaldehyde) is used in making a photoresist.

== In winemaking ==
The Nitrogen by O-Phthaldialdehyde Assay (NOPA) is one of the methods used in winemaking to measure yeast assimilable nitrogen (or YAN) needed by wine yeast in order to successfully complete fermentation.

== Isomeric phthalaldehydes ==
- isophthalaldehyde (benzene-1,3-dicarbaldehyde)
- terephthalaldehyde (benzene-1,4-dicarbaldehyde)
