= Council for Scientific Policy =

The Council for Scientific Policy, 1965–1972, was a council set up in the United Kingdom by the Secretary of State for Education and Science. The council advised the secretary of state on all aspects of his responsibilities with reference to science policy.

== History ==
The main purpose of the Council for Scientific Policy was to advise the government on the resources for science. Before 1965 this advice was given by the Advisory Council on Scientific Policy. The council was instructed to build a constructive relationship with other research councils, and the Ministry of Technology and the Royal Society. The secretariat was run by the Department of Education and Science (DES).

Chair persons:

- 1965–1970: Sir Harrie Massey
- 1970–1972: Sir Frederick Dainton

Most members were eminent scientists drawn from universities and industry. A prominent member was Derek Barton FRS, FRSE an organic chemist and Nobel Prize laureate. Also included were assessors from the Medical Research Council and Agricultural Research Council, representatives from Department of Education and Science, Department of Scientific and Industrial Research, and the University Grants Committee, the Cabinet Office and the Ministry of Technology. The council's primary interest was research, carried out in universities and by the other research councils. The council had a number of committees, sub-committees and working parties. In 1972 the Council for Scientific Policy was wound up and most of its functions passed to the Advisory Board for the Research Councils. In 1992, responsibility for scientific matters was transferred to the new Office of Science and Technology.
