= Maurice Morton =

- Maurice Morton teaching at the Institute of Rubber Research.
- Born: June 3, 1913; Russian Empire
- Died: March 23, 1994 (aged 80); Cleveland, OH
- Education: McGill University
- Known for: Polymers
- Awards: Charles Goodyear Medal (1985)
- Scientific career
- Fields: Polymer science
- Workplaces: Concordia University, University of Akron

Maurice Morton (3 June 1913 – 23 March 1994) was a polymer author, educator, and researcher. He was the first director of the University of Akron's Institute of Rubber Research, which in 1993 was renamed the Maurice Morton Institute of Polymer Science.

== Personal ==
Morton was born Meishel Abramowitz in the Russian Empire on 3 June 1913. Due to political instability following World War I, Morton's family moved from Latvia to Canada, settling in Montreal. Some of his earliest memories were of gunfire when the Russian Revolution began in St. Petersburg. He attended college at McGill University. He married Lilian Rosenbloom in 1933. The two were married for sixty years, until her death in 1993. Morton emigrated to the United States in 1948, to take a position at the University of Akron, where he would remain for his career. Morton had three children, Jay Dennis, John Alex, and Ruth.

== Education ==
- 1934 – BA Chemistry at McGill University
- 1945 – PhD Chemistry, McGill University on the topic of emulsion copolymerization of butadiene-styrene (SBR) rubber.

== Career ==
- 1936 – 1941 Chief Chemist - Johns Manville, Quebec
- 1941 – 1944 Chief Chemist - Congoleum Canada, Montreal
- 1945 – 1948 Assistant Professor and department head at Concordia University
- 1948 – hired by George S. Whitby as assistant director of rubber research for the U. S. Government Rubber Research Program's at the University of Akron. Some of his first accomplishments were the design and execution of experiments to confirm theories developed by Paul J. Flory.
- 1952 – upon retirement of Prof. Whitby, the university appointed Morton as the first Professor of Polymer Chemistry, and assistant director of the chemistry department.
- 1956 – founded the Ph.D. program in Polymer Chemistry at the university's Institute of Rubber Research
- 1962 – served as chairman of the ACS Division of Polymer Chemistry.
- 1993 – retired as Regents Professor Emeritus of Polymer Chemistry

Morton held three patents in polymer chemistry. He wrote more than 100 technical articles over his career, as well as widely used texts. His most cited research article treated the subject of anionic polymerization of vinyl monomers.

== Awards and Recognitions ==
- 1979 – Colwyn medal of the Plastics and Rubber Institute of Great Britain
- 1985 – Charles Goodyear Medal from the ACS Rubber Division
- 1988 – Paul J. Flory Polymer Education Award
- 1990 – Médaille de la Ville de Paris
- 1991 – Honorary Doctorate, University of Akron
- 1994 – International Rubber Science Hall of Fame
