= Ceiling temperature =

Ceiling temperature ($T_c$) is a measure of the tendency of a polymer to revert to its constituent monomers. When a polymer is at its ceiling temperature, the rate of polymerization and depolymerization of the polymer are equal. Generally, the ceiling temperature of a given polymer is correlated to the steric hindrance of the polymer’s monomers. Polymers with high ceiling temperatures are often commercially useful. Polymers with low ceiling temperatures are more readily depolymerizable.

== Thermodynamics of polymerization ==
At a given temperature, the reversibility of polymerization can be determined using the Gibbs free energy equation:

$$\Delta G_p = \Delta H_p - T \Delta S_p$$

where $\Delta S_p$ is the change of entropy during polymerization. The change of enthalpy during polymerization, $\Delta H_p$, is also known as the heat of polymerization, which is defined by

$$\Delta H_p = E_p - E_{dp}$$

where $E_p$ and $E_{dp}$ denote the activation energies for polymerization and depolymerization, respectively, on the assumption that depolymerization occurs by the reverse mechanism of polymerization.

Entropy is the measure of randomness or chaos. A system has a lower entropy when there are few objects in the system and has a higher entropy when there are many objects in the system. Because the process of depolymerization involves a polymer being broken down into its monomers, depolymerization increases entropy. In the Gibbs free energy equation, the entropy term is negative. It is enthalpy that drives polymerizations. At low temperatures, the enthalpy term is greater than the $T\Delta S_p$ term, which allows polymerization to occur. At the ceiling temperature, the enthalpy term and the entropy term are equal, so that the rates of polymerization and depolymerization become equal and the net polymerization rate becomes zero. Above the ceiling temperature, the rate of depolymerization is greater than the rate of polymerization, which prevents the formation of the polymer. Since :$\Delta H_p$ and $\Delta S_p$ are fairly constant with temperature change, the ceiling temperature can be defined by

$$T_c = \frac{\Delta H_p}{\Delta S_p}$$

== Monomer-polymer equilibrium ==
This phenomenon was first described by Snow and Frey in 1943. The thermodynamic explanation is due to Frederick Dainton and K. J. Ivin, who proposed that the chain propagation step of the polymerization is reversible.

At the ceiling temperature, there will always be excess monomers in the polymer due to the equilibrium between polymerization and depolymerization. Polymers derived from simple vinyl monomers have such high ceiling temperatures that only a small amount of monomers remain in the polymer at ordinary temperatures. The situation for α-methylstyrene, PhC(Me)=CH_{2}, is an exception to this trend. Its ceiling temperature is around 66 °C. Steric hindrance is significant in polymers derived from α-methylstyrene because the phenyl and methyl groups are bonded to the same carbon. These steric effects in combination with stability of the tertiary benzylic α-methylstyryl radical give α-methylstyrene its relatively low ceiling temperature. When a polymer has a very high ceiling temperature, it degrades via bond cleavage reactions instead of depolymerization. A similar effect explains the relatively low ceiling temperature for polyisobutylene.

== Ceiling temperatures of common monomers ==
Monomer	Ceiling temperature (°C)	Structure
1,3-butadiene	585	CH_{2}=CHCH=CH_{2}
ethylene	610	CH_{2}=CH_{2}
isobutylene	175	CH_{2}=CMe_{2}
isoprene	466	CH_{2}=C(Me)CH=CH_{2}
methyl methacrylate	198	CH_{2}=C(Me)CO_{2}Me
α-methylstyrene	66	PhC(Me)=CH_{2}
styrene	395	PhCH=CH_{2}
tetrafluoroethylene	1100	CF_{2}=CF_{2}
