= Jephcott baronets =

Title in the Baronetage of the United Kingdom

The Jephcott Baronetcy, of East Portlemouth in the County of Devon, is a title in the Baronetage of the United Kingdom. It was created on 14 February 1962 for the businessman Harry Jephcott. He was notably Chairman of the Glaxo Group. As of 2014 the title has been held by his grandson, the fourth Baronet, who succeeded his father in 2012.

== Jephcott baronets, of East Portlemouth (1962) ==
- Sir Harry Jephcott, 1st Baronet (1891–1978)
- Sir (John) Anthony Jephcott, 2nd Baronet (1924–2003)
- Sir Neil Welbourn Jephcott, 3rd Baronet (1929–2012)
- Sir David Welbourn Jephcott, 4th Baronet (born 1952)

The heir presumptive is the present holder's brother Mark Lanwer Jephcott (born 1957).
The heir presumptive's heir apparent is his son Richard Lanwer Jephcott (born 1989)

Coat of arms of Jephcott baronets
Crest A Dove supporting with the dexter claw a Rod of Aesculapius proper the Serpent Vert Escutcheon Azure two Chevronnels between in chief a Mortar and Pestle between two Escallops Or and in base an Open Book proper edged and clasped Or Motto Scientia Salutem Feramus (By science let us bring health)
