= Advisory Council on Scientific Policy =

Former UK government entity

- Type: Government body
- Industry: Science policy
- Founded: 1947
- Founder: Lord President of the Council
- Defunct: 1964
- Successor: Council for Scientific Policy
- Headquarters: London, United Kingdom
- Key people: Sir Henry Tiizard, Sir Solly Zuckerman, Professor A. R. Todd (Lord Todd)
- Services: Science policy advice
- Owner: UK Government
- Members: Initially 13

The Advisory Council on Scientific Policy was a UK Government body established in 1947. It had a duty to advise the Lord President of the council on his responsibilities in the formulation and execution of Government scientific policy. It was dissolved in 1964 when its responsibilities devolved to the Council for Scientific Policy.

== History ==
By 1945 a number of organisations undertook scientific research for the Government. These included the Department of Scientific and Industrial Research (DSIR), the Medical Research Council, the Agricultural Research Council, and the Royal Society. However, there was little central co-ordination of scientific activities. Pressure groups of scientists and Members of Parliament campaigned for better co-ordination. Herbert Morrison was appointed Lord President in 1945 and established a Committee on Future Scientific Policy. By early 1947 the committee had evolved into two organisations namely the Advisory Council on Scientific Policy, and the Defence Research Policy Committee.

== Constitution ==
The Advisory Council had two chairmen during its 17-year existence:

- Sir Henry Tizard, 1947 to 1952
- Professor Alexander R. Todd, 1952 to 1964.

In 1949 the post of deputy chairman was created, to reduce the burden of work on the chairman. The first deputy chairman was Professor Solly Zuckerman.

Most members were eminent scientists drawn from universities and industry. As constituted in 1947 the council had 13 members drawn from: the Department of Scientific and Industrial Research; the Treasury; University of Oxford; University of Cambridge; University of Birmingham; the Agricultural Research Council; an Industrial Manufacturer (Parsons); the Medical Research Council; the Royal Society; Imperial Chemical Industries; the Ministry of Works; and the University Grants Committee.

== Operation ==
The Council published 17 Annual Reports as Command Papers (Cmnd.). The last report dated December 1964 included a review of the changes that had taken place during the council's working life.

The report noted that expenditure on civil science had increased tenfold in 17 years. But this could double in the next five years. In 1964 government expenditure on civil research was £204.5 million, this was on agriculture, forestry, fisheries and food; industry and communications; medicine and health; overseas research; nuclear science; universities and learned societies; and on aviation.

The scale of scientific effort by other leading nations had been a significant factor in the deteriorating position of the UK in world markets. Britain was still spending too little on the advancement and exploitation of science.

The Council observed that there were an increasing number of fields in which research and development of national importance was undertaken but which was beyond the capacity of industry.

== Dissolution ==
The Advisory Council on Scientific Policy was dissolved on 15 December 1964. Two of its members were transferred to the new Council for Scientific Policy.
