= Telechelic polymer =

A telechelic polymer or oligomer is a prepolymer capable of entering into further polymerization or other reactions through its reactive end-groups. It can be used for example to synthesize block copolymers.

By definition, a telechelic polymer is a di-end-functional polymer where both ends possess the same functionality. Where the chain-ends of the polymer are not of the same functionality they are termed di-end-functional polymers.

All polymers resulting from living polymerization are end-functional but may not necessarily be telechelic.

Telechelic polymers with different number of reactive end groups can be termed according to the number of end-groups as “hemi-” (one), “di-” (two),” and “tri-telechelic” (three) polymers. When it presents many end groups it is called “polytelechelic”.

To prepare polymers by step-growth polymerization, telechelic polymers like polymeric diols and epoxy prepolymers can be used. The main examples are:

- Polyether diols;
- Polyester diols;
- Polycarbonate diols: Polyhexamethylene carbonate diol (PHMCD);
- Polyalcadiene diols: Hydroxyl-terminated polybutadiene (PBHT)...

Other examples of telechelic polymers are the halato-telechelic polymers or halatopolymers. The end-groups of these polymers are ionic or ionizable like carboxylate or quaternary ammonium groups.

== Synthesis ==
Telechelic polymers can be synthesized by different polymerization mechanisms. From vinyl monomers, among synthetic strategies are controlled radical polymerization and anionic polymerization. In the case of olefins, that is difficult to be functionalized, recent advances in insertion polymerization and post-polymerization can be used to produce telechelic polyolefins.

== Application ==
Telechelic polymers are important in the preparation of block copolymers acting as building blocks for the structural design of these copolymers. Particularly, ABA triblock copolymers has received much industrial interest for development of thermoplastic elastomers.
