= Living cationic polymerization =

Living cationic polymerization is a living polymerization technique involving cationic propagating species. It enables the synthesis of very well defined polymers (low molar mass distribution) and of polymers with unusual architecture such as star polymers and block copolymers and living cationic polymerization is therefore as such of commercial and academic interest.

== Basics ==
In carbocationic polymerization the active site is a carbocation with a counterion in close proximity. The basic reaction steps are:

A^{+}B^{−} + H_{2}C=CHR → A-CH_{2}-RHC^{+}----B^{−}

- Chain propagation:

A-CH_{2}-RHC^{+}----B^{−} + H_{2}C=CHR → A-(CH_{2}-RHC)_{n}-CH_{2}-RHC^{+}----B^{−}

- Chain termination:

A-(CH_{2}-RHC)_{n}-CH_{2}-RHC^{+}----B^{−} → A-(CH_{2}-RHC)_{n}-CH_{2}-RHC-B

- chain transfer:

A-(CH_{2}-RHC)_{n}-CH_{2}-RHC^{+}----B^{−} → A-(CH_{2}-RHC)_{n}-CH_{2}=CR H^{+}B^{−}

Living cationic polymerization is characterised by defined and controlled initiation and propagation while minimizing side-reactions termination and chain transfer. Transfer and termination do occur but in ideal living systems the active ionic propagating species are in chemical equilibrium with the dormant covalent species with an exchange rate much faster than the propagation rate. Solution methods require rigorous purification of monomer and solvent although conditions are not as strict as in anionic polymerization.

Common monomers are vinyl ethers, alpha-methyl vinyl ethers, isobutene, styrene, methylstyrene and N-vinylcarbazole. The monomer is nucleophilic and substituents should be able to stabilize a positive carbocationic charge. For example, para-methoxystyrene is more reactive than styrene itself.

Initiation takes place by an initiation/coinitiation binary system, for example an alcohol and a Lewis acid. The active electrophile is then a proton and the counter ion the remaining alkoxide which is stabilized by the Lewis acid. With organic acetates such as cumyl acetate the initiating species is the carbocation R^{+} and the counterion is the acetate anion. In the iodine/hydrogen iodide system the electrophile is again a proton and the carbocation is stabilized by the triiodide ion. Polymerizations with diethylaluminium chloride rely on trace amounts of water. A proton is then accompanied by the counterion Et_{2}AlClOH^{−}. With tert-butyl chloride Et_{2}AlCl abstracts a chlorine atom to form the tert-butyl carbocation as the electrophile. Efficient initiators that resemble the monomer are called cationogens. Termination and chain transfer are minimized when the initiator counterion is both non-nucleophilic and non-basic. More polar solvents promote ion dissociation and hence increase molar mass.

Common additives are electron donors, salts and proton traps. Electron donors (e.g. nucleophiles, Lewis bases) for example dimethylsulfide and dimethylsulfoxide are believed to stabilize the carbocation. The addition of salt for example a tetraalkylammonium salt, prevents dissociation of the ion pair that is the propagating reactive site. Ion dissociation into free ions lead to non-living polymerization. Proton traps scavenge protons originating from protic impurities.

== History ==
The method was developed starting in the 1970s and 1980s with contributions from Higashimura on the polymerization of p-methoxystyrene using iodine or acetyl perchlorate, on the polymerization of isobutyl vinyl ether by iodine and with Mitsuo Sawamoto by iodine/HI and on the formation of p-methoxystyrene - isobutyl vinyl ether block copolymers.

Kennedy and Faust studied methylstyrene / boron trichloride polymerization (then called quasi-living) in 1982 and that of isobutylene (system with cumyl acetate, 2,4,4-trimethylpentane-2-acetate and BCl_{3}) in 1984 Around same time Kennedy and Mishra discovered very efficient living polymerization of isobutylene (system with Tertiary Alkyl (or Aryl) Methyl Ether and BCl_{3})[ that paved the way for rapid development of macromolecularly engineered polymers.

== Isobutylene polymerization ==
Living isobutylene polymerization typically takes place in a mixed solvent system comprising a non-polar solvent, such as hexane, and a polar solvent, such as chloroform or dichloromethane, at temperatures below 0 °C. With more polar solvents polyisobutylene solubility becomes a problem. Initiators can be alcohols, halides and ethers. Coinitiators are boron trichloride, tin tetrachloride and organoaluminum halides. With ethers and alcohols the true initiator is the chlorinated product. Polymer with molar mass of 160,000 g/mole and polydispersity index 1.02 can be obtained.

== Vinyl ether polymerization ==
Vinyl ethers (CH_{2}=CHOR, R = methyl, ethyl, isobutyl, benzyl) are very reactive vinyl monomers. Studied systems are based on I_{2}/HI and on zinc halides zinc chloride, zinc bromide and zinc iodide.

== Living cationic ring-opening polymerization ==
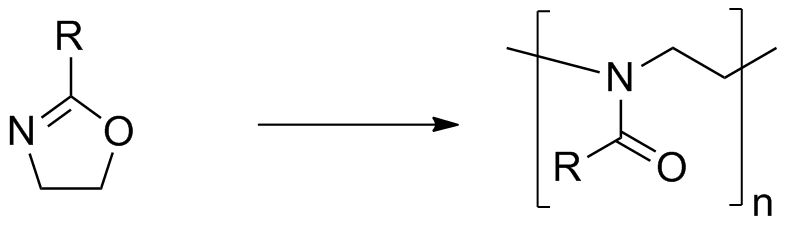
Living cationic ring-opening polymerization of 2‑oxazoline to poly(2‑oxazoline)

In Living cationic ring-opening polymerization the monomer is a heterocycle such as an epoxide, THF, an oxazoline or an aziridine such as t-butylaziridine. The propagating species is not a carbocation but an oxonium ion. Living polymerization is more difficult to achieve because of the ease of termination by nucleophilic attack of a heteroatom in the growing polymer chain. Intramolecular termination is called backbiting and results in the formation of cyclic oligomers. Initiators are strong electrophiles such as triflic acid. Triflic anhydride is an initiator for bifunctional polymer.
