= Depolymerization =

Depolymerization (or depolymerisation) is the process of converting a polymer into a monomer or a mixture of monomers. This process is driven by an increase in entropy.

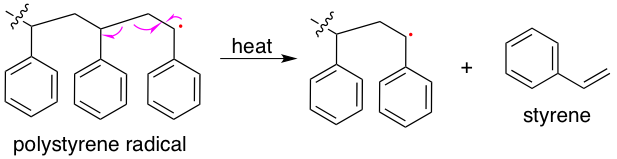
Depolymerization of polystyrene via radical elimination mechanism

== Ceiling temperature ==
The tendency of polymers to depolymerize is indicated by their ceiling temperature. At this temperature, the enthalpy of polymerization matches the entropy gained by converting a large molecule into monomers. Above the ceiling temperature, the rate of depolymerization is greater than the rate of polymerization, which inhibits the formation of the given polymer.

Ceiling Temperatures of Common Organic Polymers
Polymer	Ceiling Temperature (°C)	Monomer
polyethylene	610	CH_{2}=CH_{2}
polyisobutylene	175	CH_{2}=CMe_{2}
polyisoprene (natural rubber)	466	CH_{2}=C(Me)CH=CH_{2}
poly(methyl methacrylate)	198	CH_{2}=C(Me)CO_{2}Me
polystyrene	395	PhCH=CH_{2}
Polytetrafluoroethylene	1100	CF_{2}=CF_{2}

== Applications ==
Depolymerization is a very common process. Digestion of food involves depolymerization of macromolecules, such as proteins. It is relevant to polymer recycling. Sometimes the depolymerization is well behaved, and clean monomers can be reclaimed and reused for making new plastic. In other cases, such as polyethylene, depolymerization gives a mixture of products. These products are, for polyethylene, ethylene, propylene, isobutylene, 1-hexene and heptane. Out of these, only ethylene can be used for polyethylene production, so other gases must be turned into ethylene, sold, or otherwise be destroyed or be disposed of by turning them into other products.

Depolymerization is also related to production of chemicals and fuels from biomass. In this case, reagents are typically required. A simple case is the hydrolysis of celluloses to glucose by the action of water. Generally this process requires an acid catalyst:

H(C_{6}H_{10}O_{5})_{n}OH + (n − 1) H_{2}O → n C_{6}H_{12}O_{6}

== See also ==
- Thermal depolymerization
- Polymer degradation
- Polymerisation
- Ceiling temperature
- Chain scission
