= Optical cage system =

Mounting system for optics

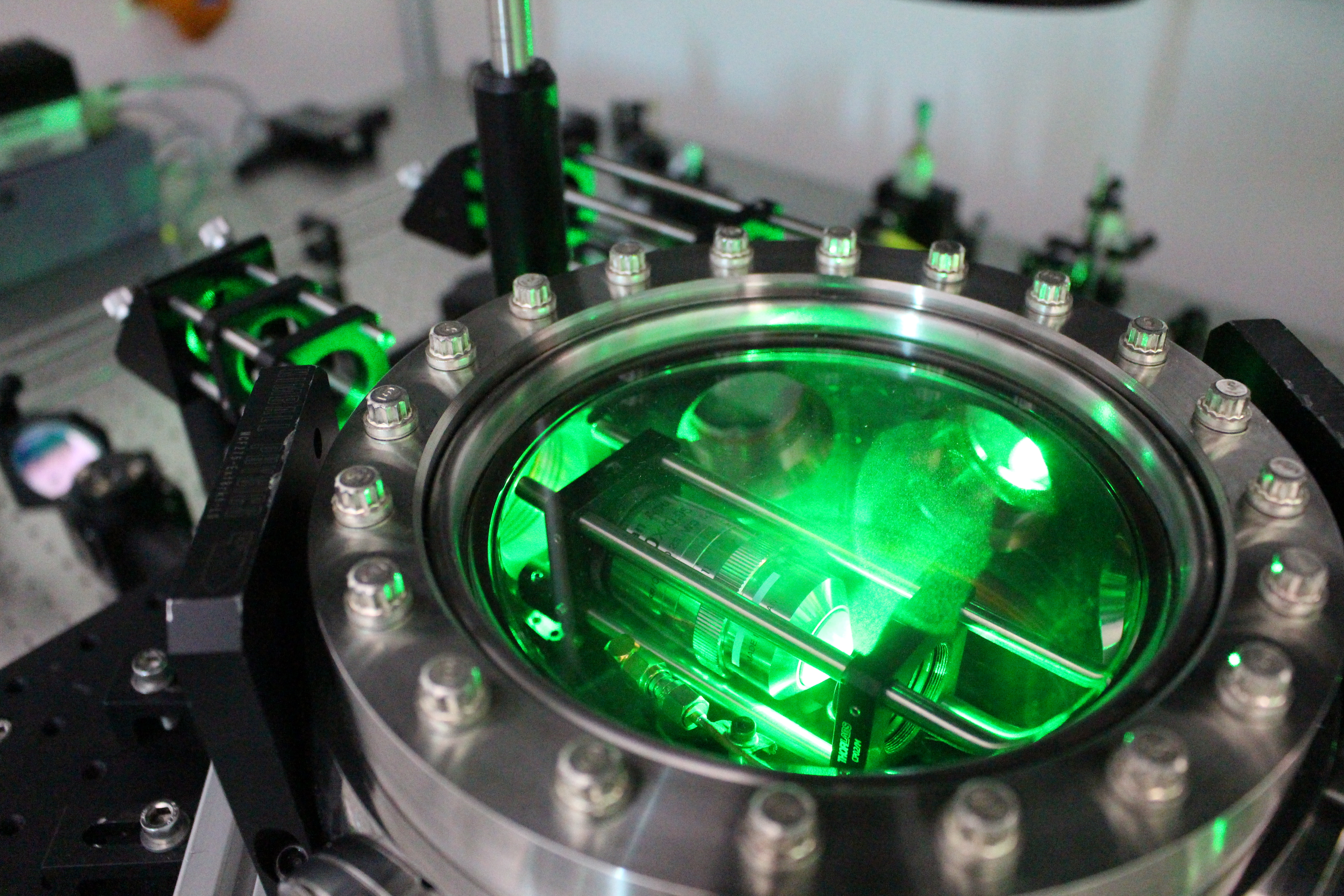
Optical cage system in a vacuum chamber

An optical cage system is an optomechanical system that is used to mount optical elements such as lenses and mirrors together in a rigid assembly. Optical systems built this way can be more compact than can be achieved using an optical table, and the system provides more flexibility than an optical rail. A cage system allows optical engineers and researchers to make self-contained instrument-like systems, without having to machine any custom parts. They are useful for education and research, and for making quick prototypes of new optical designs.

A typical optical cage system mounts each optical element in a plate. Thin rods inserted through holes in the plates allow several plates to be mounted in series, with the optical elements aligned along a common axis. A variety of hardware supports more complex designs, including optical paths that turn corners and adjustable elements.

== History ==
The development of optical cage systems began with "optical erector sets": educational toys designed for children. These injection-molded plastic kits allowed the child to construct various optical instruments such as a telescope, microscope, and spectroscope. An advanced optical erector set called Microbench was introduced by Spindler & Hoyer in Germany in 1976. It consisted of 40×40 mm square mounting plates with 25 or 30 mm holes at the center, and four 6 mm bores around the edges. If four 6 mm rods were secured on the corners, a second mounting plate could slide along the rods, and be secured at any point via set screws. By securing individual lenses within each mounting plate, a telescope could be constructed. Spindler & Hoyer introduced a larger system for constructing larger optical experiments: This was called Macrobench, and consisted of 150×150 mm mounting plates capable of securing up to 110 mm optical elements. The rods were bigger (20 mm diameter), and were hollow. By combining these mounting plates much higher precision optical experiments could be constructed such as an interferometer, etc.

In 1995, Thorlabs simplified the Microbench design by removing the corner-connector bores, and offered it at a cheaper price. It was called the Cage System. This made the product much more widely used around the world.

An alternative system called Optoform was introduced in 1994, invented by Ali Afshari. This system used round mounting plates rather than the square ones used by other systems, allowing cost-effective manufacturing by CNC lathes with live tooling. The circular shape also allows the plates to be mounted at many angles rather than just at 90° increments, and allows optical elements to be held at three points 120° apart rather than four. This allows easier insertion and removal of optical components. Optoform has continued since then by its original inventor, Ali Afshari, who further developed the system to become more versatile, and affordable. Optoform philosophy, and its applications has been publicized through its website optoform.com, and a 40-page quarterly magazine called: "Optomechanix". Optoform has entered a new era since the announcement of its new generation "Optoform II" system. Following the legacy of Optoform I, the new Optoform patent US20220099907A1 has 23 illustrations to cover its revolutionary ideas for the optical industry.

== Applications ==
Cage systems have been used by research centres and universities around the world to construct spectroscopy experiments, third-harmonic generation microscopy, fibre optics setups, biomedical instruments, eye surgery apparatus, telescopes, stellar interferometers, imaging systems, vacuum experiments, etc.
