= Two-state trajectory =

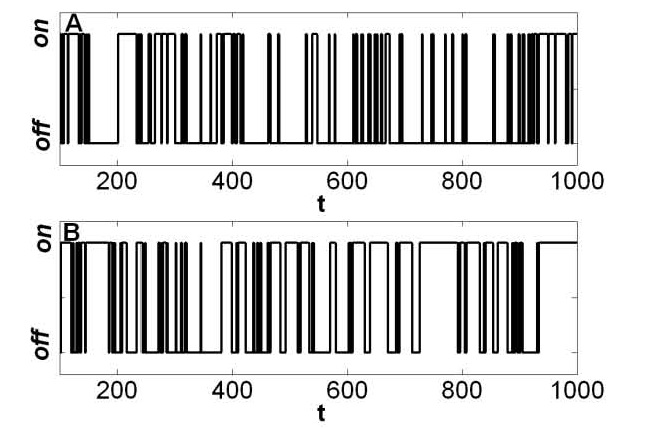
Figure 1: Two-state trajectories

A two-state trajectory (also termed two-state time trajectory or a trajectory with two states) is a dynamical signal that fluctuates between two distinct values: ON and OFF, open and closed, $+/-$, etc. Mathematically, the signal $X(t)$ has, for every $t,$ either the value $X(t)=c_\mathrm{off}$ or $X(t)=c_\mathrm{on}$.

In most applications, the signal is stochastic; nevertheless, it can have deterministic ON-OFF components. A completely deterministic two-state trajectory is a square wave. There are many ways one can create a two-state signal, e.g. flipping a coin repeatedly.

A stochastic two-state trajectory is among the simplest stochastic processes. Extensions include: three-state trajectories, higher discrete state trajectories, and continuous trajectories in any dimension.

== Two state trajectories in biophysics, and related fields ==
Two state trajectories are very common. Here, we focus on relevant trajectories in scientific experiments: these are seen in measurements in chemistry, physics, and the biophysics of individual molecules (e.g. measurements of protein dynamics and DNA and RNA dynamics, activity of ion channels, enzyme activity, quantum dots). From these experiments, one aims at finding the correct model explaining the measured process. We explain about various relevant systems in what follows.

=== Ion channels ===
Since the ion channel is either opened or closed, when recording the number of ions that go through the channel when time elapses, observed is a two-state trajectory of the current versus time.

=== Enzymes ===
Here, there are several possible experiments on the activity of individual enzymes with a two-state signal. For example, one can create substrate that only upon the enzymatic activity shines light when activated (with a laser pulse). So, each time the enzyme acts, we see a burst of photons during the time period that the product molecule is in the laser area.

=== Dynamics of biological molecules ===
Structural changes of molecules are viewed in various experiments' type. Förster resonance energy transfer is an example. In many cases one sees a time trajectory that fluctuates among several cleared defined states.

=== Quantum dots ===
Another system that fluctuates among an on state and an off state is a quantum dot. Here, the fluctuations are since the molecule is either in a state that emits photons or in a dark state that does not emit photons (the dynamics among the states are influenced also from its interactions with the surroundings).

== See also ==
- Single-molecule experiment
- Reduced dimensions form
- Kinetic scheme
- Master equation
- Wave
