= County College of Morris =

Public college in Randolph, New Jersey, US

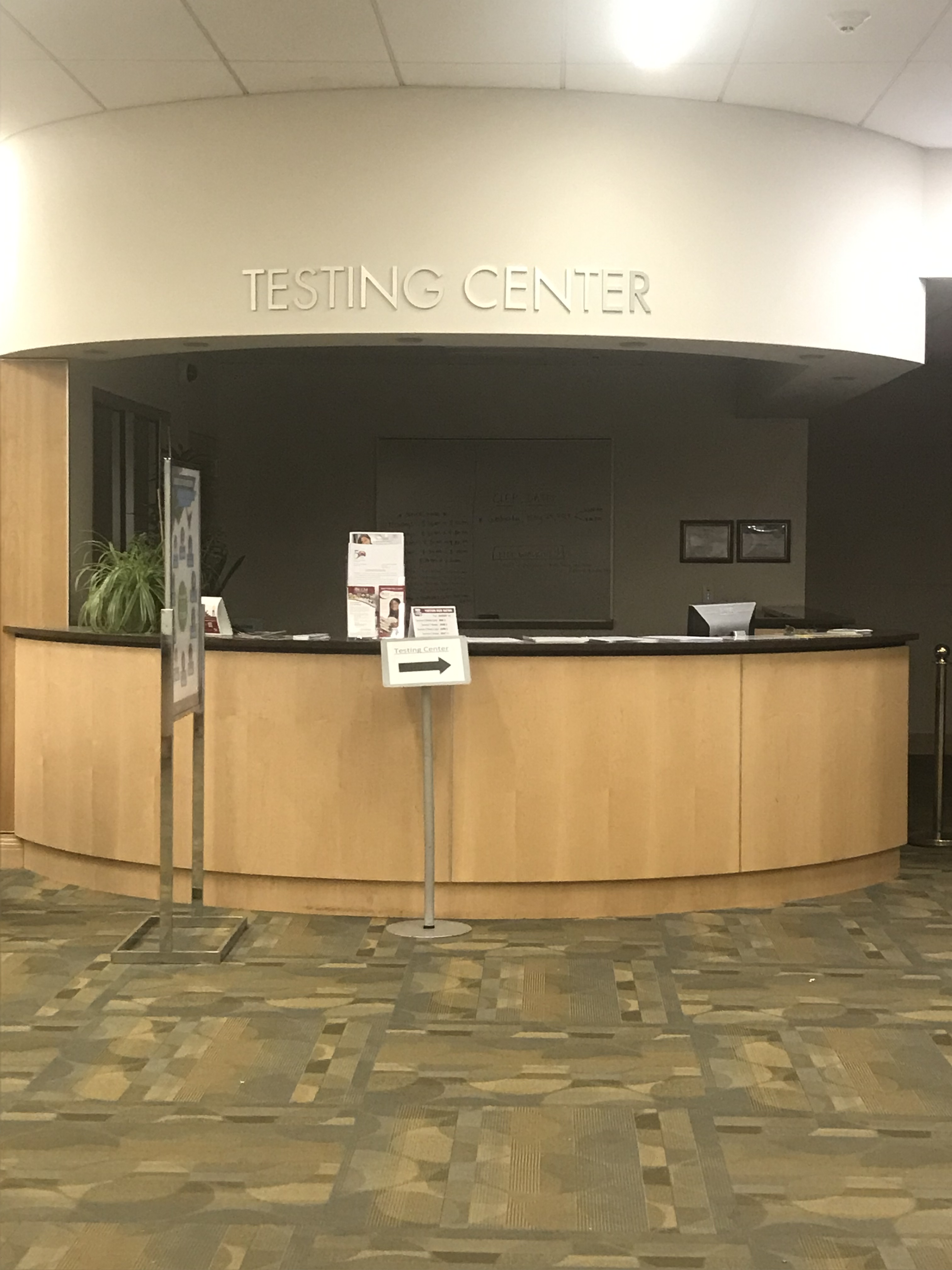
- Testing Center at County College of Morris
- Motto: Sapere aude
- Motto in English: Dare to know
- Type: Public community college
- Established: 1968
- Academic affiliations: Sea-grant
- President: Anthony J. Iacono
- Undergraduates: 7000
- Location: Randolph, New Jersey, United States; 40°51′30″N 74°34′50″W
- Campus: Suburban
- Colors
- Nickname: Titans
- Sporting affiliations: Garden State Athletic Conference; NJCAA Division II
- Website: www.ccm.edu

County College of Morris (CCM) is a public community college in Randolph, New Jersey. CCM offers associate degree and certificate programs as well as transfer opportunities for students looking to pursue a bachelor's degree at another institution, along with workforce development offerings.

== History ==
Founded in 1966, the college first opened its doors to students in 1968. The college's first president was Sherman H. Masten. The college's library was later renamed in his honor, becoming the Sherman H. Masten Learning Resource Center.

When Masten retired in 1986, Edward J. Yaw became president of CCM. Yaw retired in 2016 and Anthony J. Iacono became the college's third president. Prior to joining CCM, Iacono had served as vice president of Academic Affairs at Indian River State College in Fort Pierce, Florida.

During the COVID-19 Pandemic, CCM changed its logo and school colors. The previous logo included a tree next to the letters "CCM" with the colors being Pantone 202 C, Pantone Cool Gray 6, and Pantone 7506 C. The new logo is a rounded square-like shape with the letters "CCM" inside with the colors being Pantone 2758 C, Pantone 380 C, and Pantone 7472 C.

== Campus ==
The college is located in Randolph, Morris County, New Jersey.

=== Infrastructure ===
In Summer 2012, the Morris County Improvement Authority installed solar parking canopies across five parking lots at CCM and upgraded exterior lighting to LED fixtures. Trees cut down to accommodate the solar installation were replaced with ornamental trees and bushes in Spring 2013.

==== Buildings ====
Cohen, DeMare, Emeriti and Sheffield halls comprise the main academic center of the campus. Other major college facilities include the LEED certified Landscape and Horticultural Technology building and greenhouses, the Advanced Manufacturing & Engineering building, Student Community Center, Learning Resource Center, the Health and Physical Education building, the Center for Health Professions and Natural Sciences, the Center for Entrepreneurship and Culinary Science, the Center for Workforce Development (located in Dover, NJ) and the Music Technology Center named in honor of Dr. Edward J. Yaw, the college's second president, Henderson Hall, which was the college's first building, serves as the main administrative building.

Morris County Vocational School District MCVSH operates a Career Training Center in partnership with the County College of Morris at the Randolph campus.

==== Longo Planetarium ====
The Madeline D. and Joseph J. Longo Planetarium is a 91-seat dome theater that features a Digistar 7 Digital Projection System, which serves astronomy classes on campus and offers public showings for education and entertainment. The planetarium also offers programs for schools, groups, scouts and other community organizations.

==== Dragonetti Auditorium ====
The Dragonetti Auditorium is a 500-seat performing arts venue.

==== Transportation ====
Parking is free to both students and alumni at student parking lots. Public transportation to the campus is available weekdays via New Jersey Transit.

== Academic profile ==
CCM is accredited by the Commission on Higher Education of the Middle States Association of Colleges and Schools, and has one of the highest graduation rates among the 19 county colleges in New Jersey.

Beginning Fall 2014, Rutgers University started offering baccalaureate degrees programs on the CCM campus in psychology, journalism, criminal justice, and public and non-profit administration.

== Student life ==
The student body consists of more than 8,500 undergraduate students. There are more than 40 student clubs on campus.

County College of Morris is smoke-free and was one of the first public colleges to ban smoking entirely. The decision to ban smoking was a project of the 2005-2006 Student Government Association.

== Athletics ==
CCM is a NJCAA Division II school. Its athletic conference is the Garden State Athletic Conference.

Men's: Baseball, Basketball, Golf, Soccer
Women's: Basketball, Soccer, Softball, Volleyball

== Student newspaper ==
The Youngtown Edition is a student newspaper published continually at the County College of Morris since the opening of the school in Fall 1968. Published biweekly, it is distributed across the campus. It covers campus issues, profiles students and professors, and world issues that may affect the students.

== Notable alumni and faculty ==
- Alex Cable, optical engineer, inventor and entrepreneur, founder of Thorlabs
- Tom Caltabiano (class of 1993), writer and stand-up comedian, who directed and co-starred in the documentary 95 Miles to Go with longtime friend Ray Romano
- Jennifer Jones (born 1967), first African-American Rockette
- Christopher McCulloch (born 1971), creator, director, and co-writer (with Doc Hammer) of the Adult Swim cartoon The Venture Bros, under the pseudonym Jackson Publick
- Joe McEwing (born 1972), baseball player who played for the New York Mets
- Adam Riggs (born 1972), former Los Angeles Angels player known for his misspelled "Angees" jersey in a 2003 game
- John Anthony Rodriguez (born 2000), musician, who performs as "54 Ultra" and is best known for his smooth, Latin soul-influenced vocals
- Brandon Sklenar (born 1990), actor best known for his roles in the films Mapplethorpe, Vice, Midway and It Ends with Us

== See also ==
- New Jersey County Colleges
- Rutgers University
- Youngtown Edition
