= Alex Cable =

American entrepreneur

- Born: Chester Borough, New Jersey
- Education: County College of Morris; Rutgers University; Stevens Institute of Technology
- Occupations: Optical engineer, entrepreneur

Alex Cable is an American optical engineer, inventor and entrepreneur. He is the founder of optical equipment manufacturer Thorlabs.

== Early life and education ==
Cable was born in Chester Borough, New Jersey, and grew up in nearby Freehold Township. As a child, he enjoyed hiking and camping in Sussex County. Cable dropped out of high school.

Cable's first job was as a dishwasher in a restaurant. He later became chef and then restaurant manager with an eye toward fulfilling his entrepreneurial desires by opening his own restaurant. However, he soon realized that the outlook for a restaurant business did not meet his expectations and left the industry. He also worked briefly as a machinist, farm manager, and printer.

Cable returned to school, attending the County College of Morris. He subsequently earned a Bachelor of Science degree in physics from Rutgers University, and a graduate degree in material science from the Stevens Institute of Technology.

== Career ==
Out of Rutgers, Cable was recruited by Steven Chu to work in his lab at Bell Labs in the spring of 1984. According to Cable, Chu especially liked Cable's diverse work history. Cable was official employed as a "technician", but Chu described him as "unofficially...a super-graduate student". At Bell Labs, Cable became involved in a series of experiments on a low-temperature atom manipulation technique known as "optical molasses". In late 1987, Chu left Bell labs to take a position at Stanford University. Chu attempted to persuade Cable to join him at Stanford, but Cable declined the offer. Cable instead chose to pursue an entrepreneurial career, having only planned a brief stay at Bell Labs.

Together with a college friend, he built two scanning tunneling microscopes for DuPont in his bedroom. The first microscope sold for about $50,000, leaving $20,000 of profit after expenses. Cable hoped to make a business out of it, entering the emerging market for the newly invented microscope. Cable's second microscope was less profitable. The business did not appear to be viable due to limited customers and limited working capital, so Cable abandoned the idea. Instead, he took "a more traditional approach", buying a milling machine which he used to design and build optomechanical parts. Selling the parts proved fruitful and also more enjoyable for Cable. In November 1989, he left Bell Labs to pursue the business full-time, naming it Thorlabs which he founded in the basement of his Newton, New Jersey home. The company was named after a Labrador retriever named Thor. He returned to Sussex County, and has made an effort to keep the business headquartered there due to his love for the area.

By 2004, Thorlabs had estimated annual sales of $50 million and was expanding into Europe. By 2010, sales had reached $125 million annually. As of 2013, the company produced approximately 20,000 unique products and employed 1,000 people. According to data published by Gale Business Insights, the company had estimated sales of $199.8 million in 2013, the most recent full-year available and had 1,500 employees as of 2016.

In 2021, Cable stepped down as president of Thorlabs, announcing his daughter, Jennifer Cable, as the new president. He remains the CEO.

Cable is a founder and director of several photonics companies including KDD FiberLabs of Tokyo, Menlo Systems GmbH, and Stratophase Ltd. He is also a director of the Boston Micromachines Corporation. In 2010, Cable founded Idesta Quantum Electronics. He sits on the advisory board of the Center for Automation Technologies and Systems at Rensselaer Polytechnic Institute.

== Academic work ==
While working at Bell Labs, Cable was part of a "lunchtime conversation" that led to a number of experiments which investigated atomic behavior at very low temperatures involving himself, Arthur Ashkin, John Bjorkholm, Steven Chu, and Leo Holberg. Subsequently, Cable was listed as a co-author on three papers in Physical Review Letters starting in 1985 that collectively have been cited more than 3700 times. The first of those papers, "Three-dimensional viscous confinement and cooling of atoms by resonance radiation pressure", led to Chu and his Stanford colleagues winning the 1997 Nobel Prize in Physics. The paper was selected as one of the journal's greatest milestones by Physical Review Letters' editors in 2008. The work has led to substantial improvement in the accuracy of atomic clocks and the discovery of the Bose–Einstein condensate.

In 2013, Cable met with several academics to explore the possibility that breath analysis could detect diseases after reading about dogs that were reported to detect cancer in their owners. His h-index is 24, according to Google Scholar.

== Personal life ==
Cable is a fitness buff, who participates in endurance sports as a form of stress release. Through Thorlabs, he advocates for personal fitness through community events.
