= Magnetic trap =

Magnetic trap refers to one of three types of traps used for atoms or charged particles:

- Magnetic mirror, a type of magnetic confinement fusion device
- Magnetic trap (atoms), used to trap neutral atoms in a magnetic field gradient
- Magnetic tweezers, a trap using a magnetic field to trap micrometre-seized ferromagnetic beads
- Magneto-optical trap (or MOT), a trap using a magnetic gradient and laser light to trap neutral atoms
- Penning trap, used to trap charged particles or ions in a combination of electrostatic potential and uniform magnetic field
