= Michel Orrit =

Physician and scientist

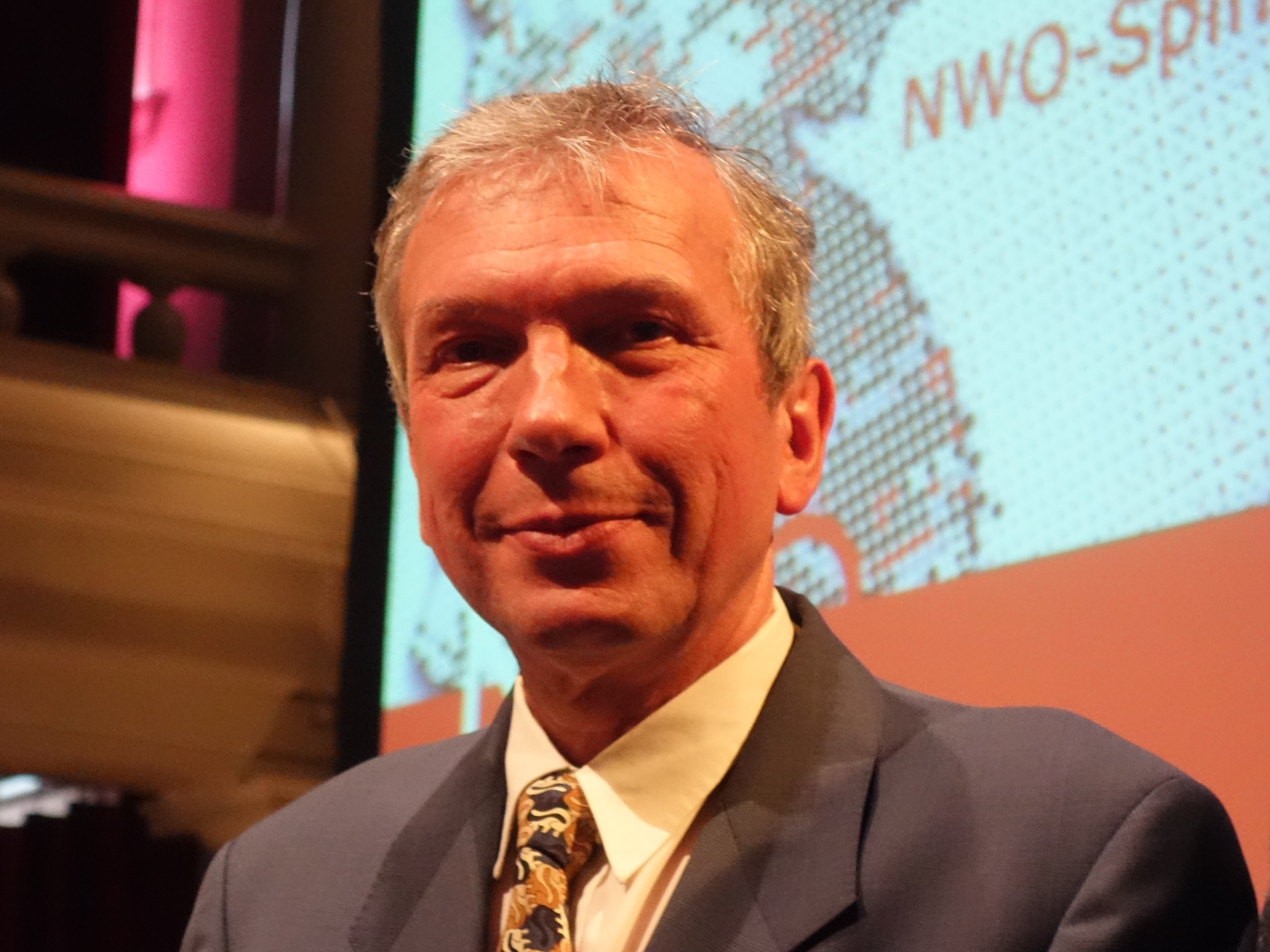
- Born: 27 February 1956 (age 70)
- Scientific career
- Fields: Nano-optics, Molecular biophysics
- Workplaces: Leiden University
- Website: www.universiteitleiden.nl/en/staffmembers/michel-orrit#tab-1

Michael Orrit (born 27 February 1956) is a French physicist who is noted for his work on single molecule physics. He is currently professor at Leiden University.

== Awards ==
- 1998 Hans Sigrist Prize
- 1985 Humboldt scholarship for a research stay in Göttingen
- 1985 Hughes Prize from the French Academy of Sciences
- 2010 Harkins Lecturer, Chicago, USA
- 2016 Edison Volta Prize
- 2017 Spinoza Prize
- 2018 Honorary Professorof the Moscow State Pedagogical University
