= Optical table =

Vibration control platform

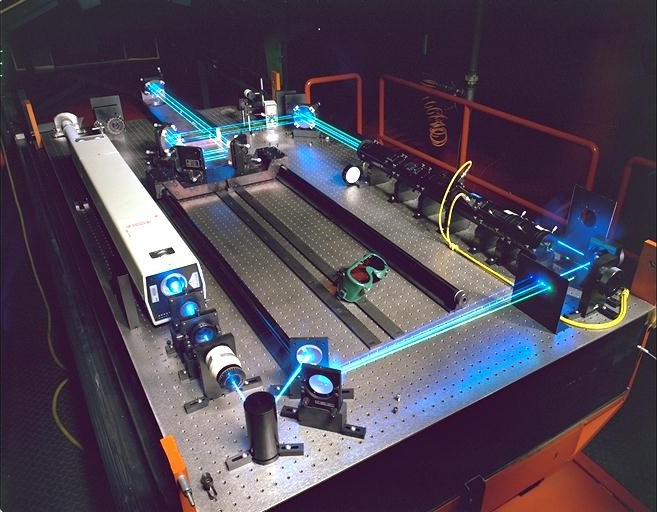
A laser system on an optical table

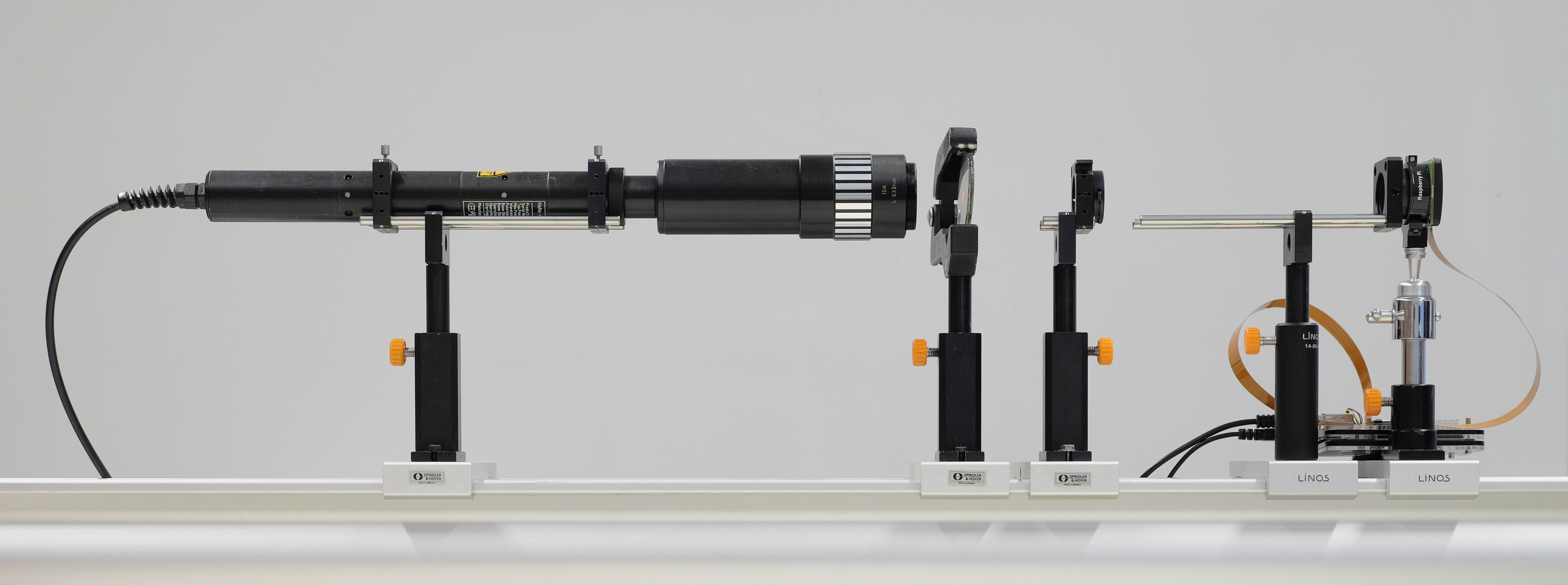
Side view of an optical bench with five riders for various optomechanical components

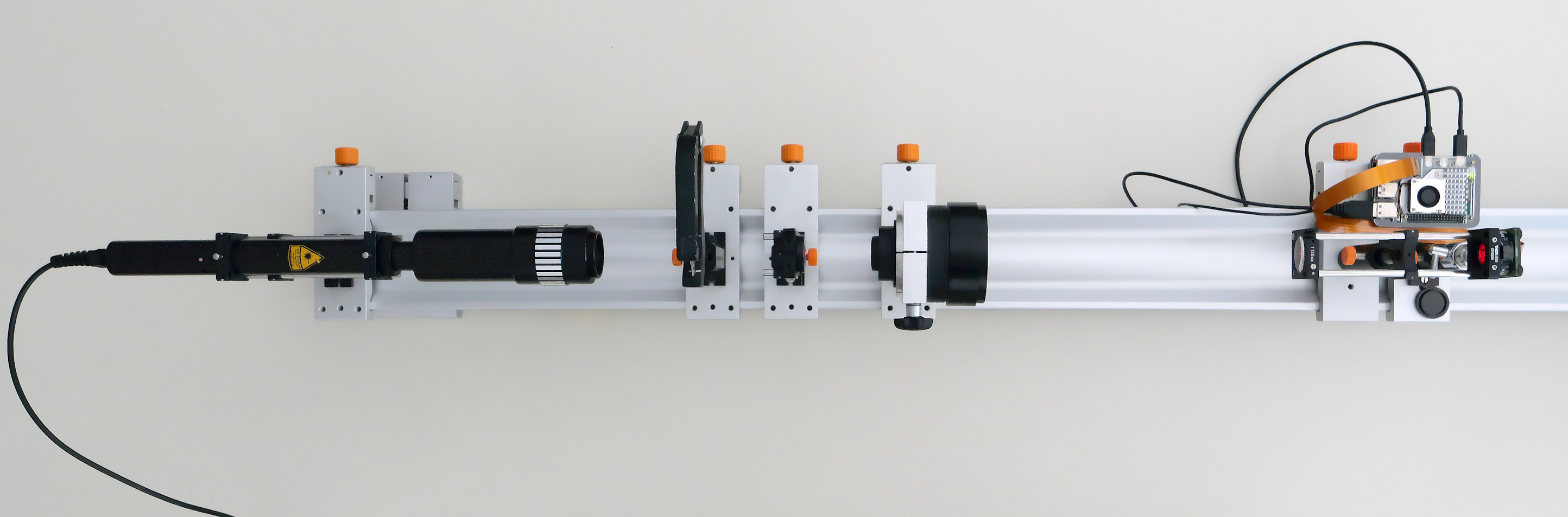
Top view of an optical bench with six riders for various optomechanical components

An optical table is a vibration control platform that is used to support systems used for laser- and optics-related experiments in science, engineering and manufacturing. The surfaces of these tables are designed to be very rigid with minimum deflection so that the alignment of optical elements remains stable over time. Many optical systems require that vibration of optical elements be kept small. As a result, optical tables are typically very heavy and incorporate vibration isolation and damping features in their structure. Many use pneumatic isolators that act as mechanical low-pass filters, reducing the ability of vibrations in the floor to cause vibrations in the tabletop. Optical tables that use pneumatic isolators are sometimes called air tables.

The surface of an optical table is typically stainless steel with a rectangular grid of tapped holes in either metric or imperial units:

- metric: M6 on a 25 mm grid
- imperial: ¼"-20 UNC on a 1" (25.4 mm) grid

Optical breadboards, benches, and rails are simpler structures that perform a similar function to optical tables. These are used in teaching and in research and development, and are also sometimes used to support permanently aligned optical systems in finished devices such as lasers.

== Explanation ==
In optical systems, especially those involving interferometry, the alignment of each component must be extremely accurate—precise down to a fraction of a wavelength—usually a few hundred nanometers. Even small vibrations or strain in the table on which the elements are set up might lead to complete failure of an experiment. Hence, one requires an extremely rigid table which neither moves nor flexes, even under changing loads or vibrations. The surface of the table must also be quite flat, to allow precision optical mounts to make good contact with the table without rocking and facilitate easy assembly of the optical system.

=== Materials and construction ===
Earlier optical table tops were sometimes made of a large slab of highly polished granite or diabase. These materials are very dense and stiff, which inhibits flexing and motion of the surface, improving the stability of the optical system. The surfaces can be ground extremely flat, which is beneficial for alignment of optical systems. Such tables were very heavy and expensive, however, and did not do a good job of damping vibrations. Mounting components to a granite surface is also difficult. Granite and diabase are still used for smaller precision-flat surfaces, but optical tables made from these materials are not commonly available today.

Modern optical tables are typically made of top and bottom sheets of steel, aluminum, or carbon fiber, separated by a thick honeycomb lattice structure. The surface usually has a grid of threaded holes which allow the components to be bolted down to fit the optical system layout. Components may also be held to the steel surface by magnetic bases. Often, the table's legs are pneumatic vibration dampers. For even more accurate setups, one also prevents air movements and temperature gradients by enclosing the surface in a box of transparent plastic such as Plexiglas. One may also use a "flowbox", a device which produces a laminar stream of air flowing downwards, kept at constant temperature by special air conditioning.

The metal used to construct modern optical tables has a higher speed of sound than granite and therefore a higher frequency of the first eigenmode. Any vibration produced on the table below this frequency does not produce a resonant response, making the setup less sensitive to vibrations from motorized optics, cooling water pumps, etc. Vibration damping may be added to tables during their construction. As with granite's composite structure, the combination of several stiff materials with different speeds of sound produces a table for which a wide range of vibrations are critically damped. Viscous fluids are used in between the stiff materials, to aid in damping.

== Breadboards ==
An alternative to an optical table is an optical breadboard. Some optical systems use breadboards made of solid aluminum for later integration with a larger system with some form of vibration control. Most optical breadboards are constructed from steel, aluminum, or carbon fiber sheets with honeycomb structure and can be placed on an ordinary table or workbench. Breadboards are not as good as optical tables, but weigh less and are adequate for smaller optical systems that do not require extremely high levels of mechanical stability. The low weight enables one to support these tables on soft air springs which reduce vibrations coming from the floor, although this increases vibrations due to acoustic noise.

The honeycomb structure reduces bending due to the breadboard's own weight, so it can be tilted and forces applied via the soft spring supports accelerate the table as a whole without misalignment. Breadboards can therefore be used in mobile applications, such as on airplanes. Also, one can bolt a breadboard onto an optical table, build up a module of the experiment on it, and then transfer the module as a whole onto another table without the need to realign the components on the breadboard. Similarly, custom-built optical devices are assembled and aligned on breadboards, which are then enclosed in a case and shipped to the customer.

== Rails and benches ==
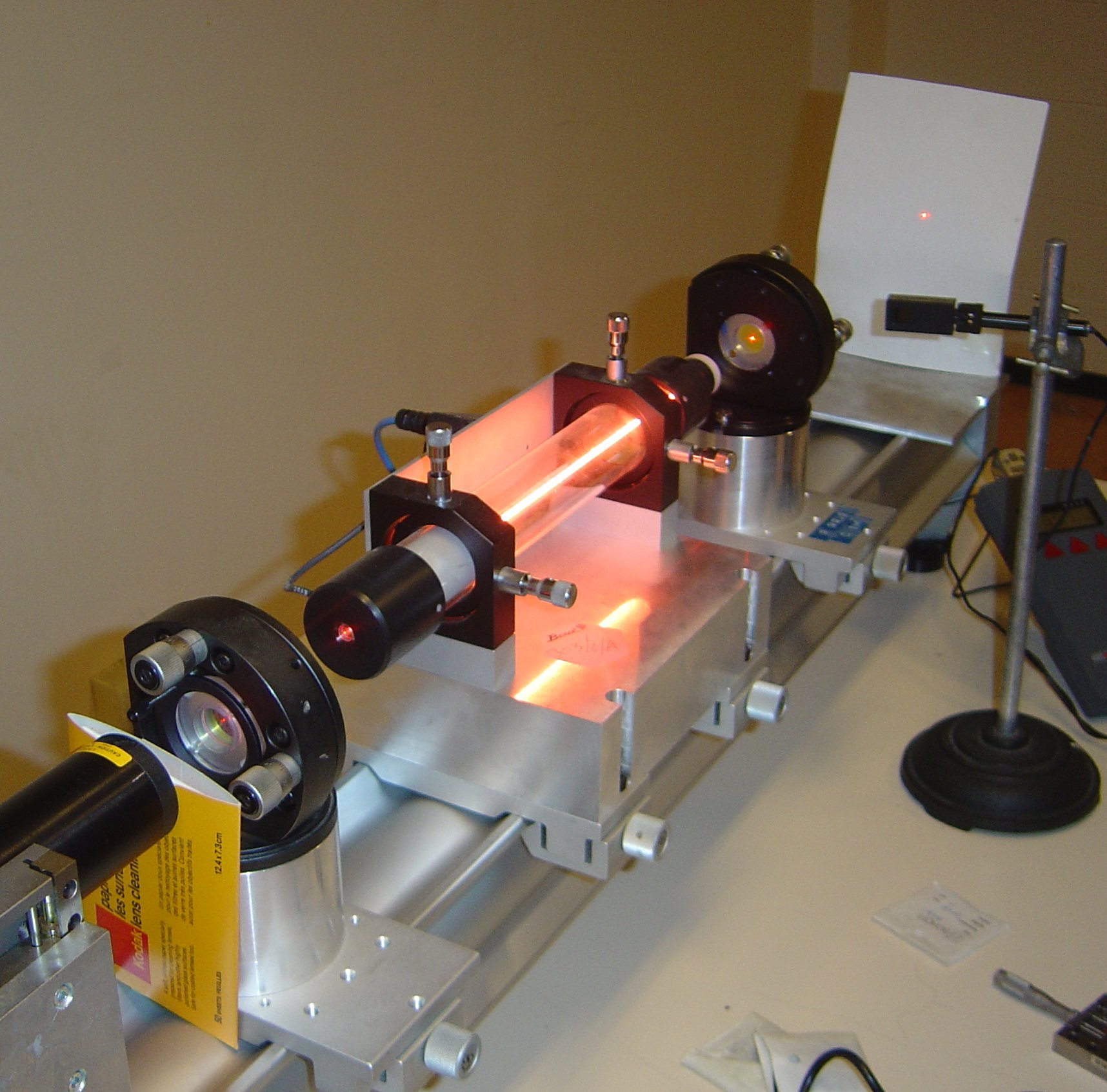
A helium-neon laser on an optical bench

An optical bench or optical rail is a simpler piece of hardware that provides a linear (or sometimes curved) track along which to mount optical elements. They are often used for simple experiments, especially for classroom demonstrations. Such rails are typically made of steel and designed to be very stiff, with features that allow holders for optical components to be bolted down and easily shifted along the length of the rail. Rails are common in laser assemblies where the beam path travels on a single axis.

A more sophisticated example is the silicon carbide ceramic toroidal optical bench in the Gaia spacecraft (illustrated), which supports several optical instruments.

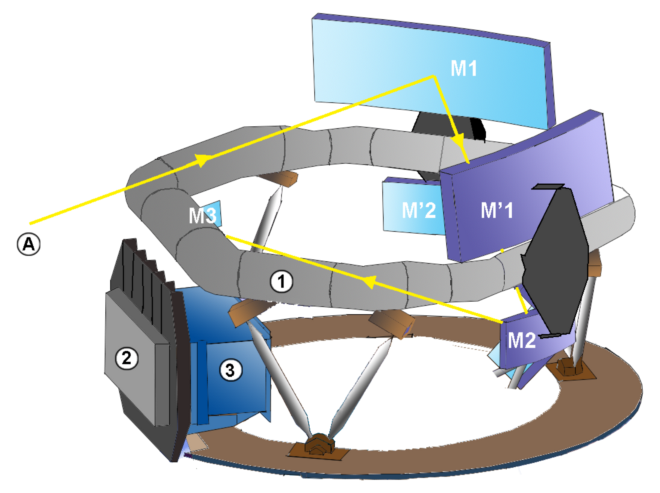
Diagram of Gaia space observatory. Item 1 is the toroidal optical bench.

== See also ==
- Optical cage system
