= Thorlabs =

American optical equipment company

Coordinates: 41.04966°N 74.74913°W

- Industry: Optical equipment
- Founded: November 1989; 36 years ago
- Founder: Alex Cable
- Headquarters: Newton, New Jersey
- Owner: Alex Cable
- Number of employees: 1,500
- Website: www.thorlabs.com

Thorlabs, Inc. is an American privately held optical equipment company headquartered in Newton, New Jersey. The company was founded in 1989 by Alex Cable, who serves as its current CEO. His daughter, Jennifer Cable, serves as president. As of 2018, Thorlabs has annual sales of approximately $500 million. Outside its multiple locations in the United States, the company has offices in Brazil, Canada, China, France, Germany, Japan, Sweden, and the United Kingdom. It sells approximately 20,000 different products.

== History ==
While working at Bell Labs, Alex Cable bought a milling machine which he used to design and build optomechanical parts in his spare time. He was able to build up the business to the point where he could afford to quit Bell Labs and pursue it full-time in November 1989. Cable thus founded Thorlabs, named after his black Labrador Retriever, Thor, in a spare bedroom in Freehold, New Jersey. Sales during the company's first year amounted to $370,000, according to Cable. Bell Labs was among its first customers. According to company figures, sales topped $10 million for the first time in 1997.

Before the telecom market collapsed in the early 2000s, such companies represented 45% of Thorlabs' business. Due to a liberal return policy, at least one quarter during the market crash, Thorlabs actually received more product from returns than it shipped. However, the company was able to quickly adapt and survived its worst year with only an 18% drop in overall revenue. In 2003 and 2004, Thorlabs began to expand its operations into Europe, acquiring companies based in Germany, Sweden, and the United Kingdom. The company had a product line of 9,000 and estimated annual sales of $50 million in 2004.

In May 2007, Thorlabs won the Laser Focus World/Phast Innovation Award for the development of the ASOM (Adaptive Scanning Optical Microscope).

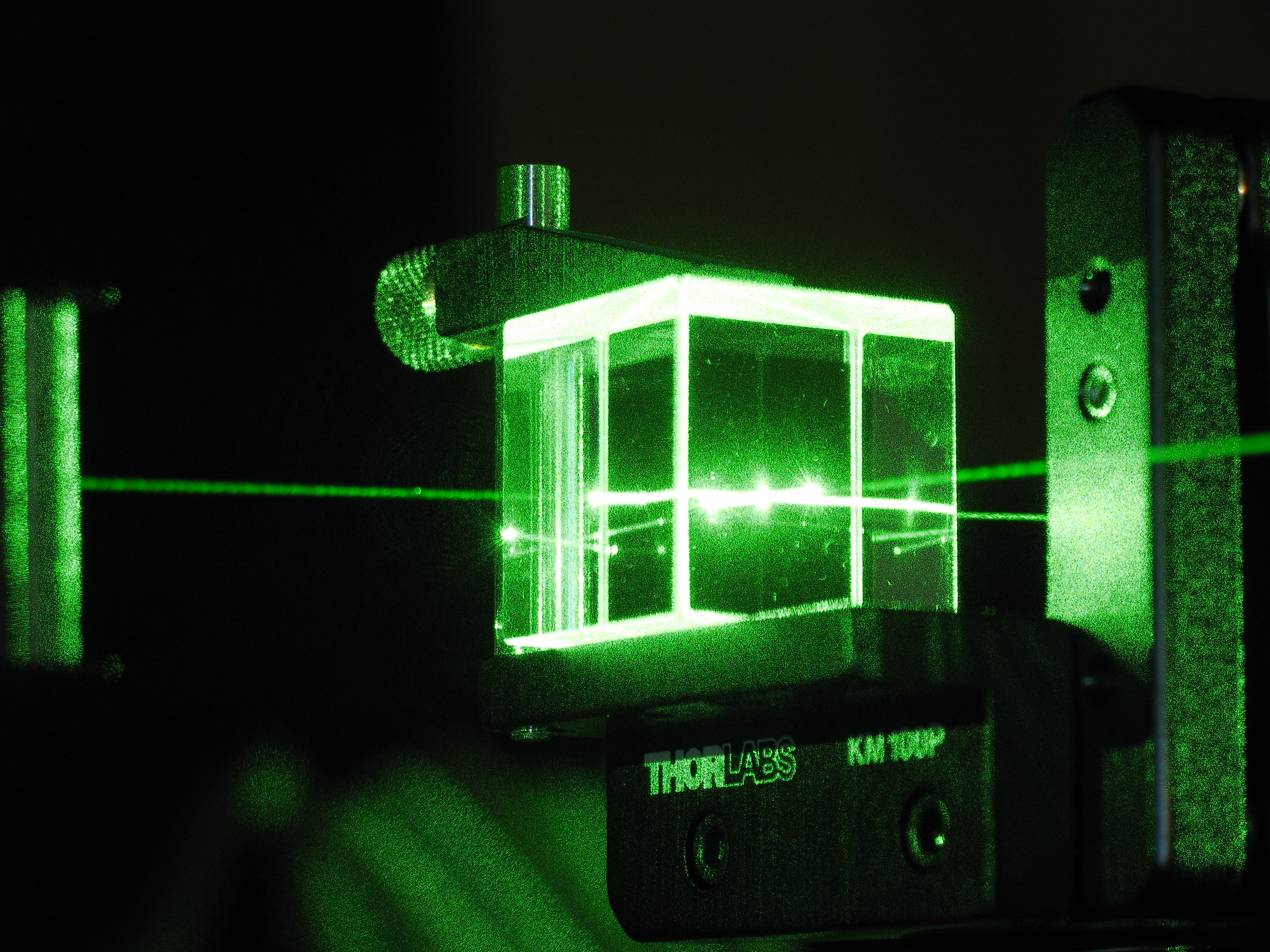
A Thorlabs brand beam splitter

In March 2009, Thorlabs acquired optoelectronic components manufacturer Covega from Gemfire. Based in Jessup, Maryland, Covega was renamed Thorlabs Quantum Electronics (TQE) and its 40,000 sq. ft. space was expanded to 60,000 sq. ft. by 2014. For the year, revenue reached $125 million and Thorlabs employed about 650 people at year's end.

In October 2010, Thorlabs broke ground on a new 125,000 sq ft headquarters in Newton. The $20 million project was funded in part by a $4 million bond grant for redeveloping a former brownfield, originally owned by the Sterling Silk Company and abandoned since 1993. Mayor Kristen Becker called the project "an integral piece" of city plans to revitalize the area. In March 2012, the 3-story office building officially opened, allowing the consolidation of Thorlabs's manufacturing, R&D, sales, and customer service operations. Headquarters were moved from Andover Township, but the 40,000 sq. ft. facility there remained operational, functioning as the company's machine shop. In 2019, Thorlabs began building new facilities in Newton, the UK, and Germany.

In October 2011, Thorlabs purchased the Burleigh line of life science products from Lumen Dynamics. In May 2012, Thorlabs acquired the Octavius line of ultrafast lasers from idesta Quantum Electronics, a member of its Strategic Partnership Program. In November, Thorlabs acquired laser supplier Maxion Technologies from Physical Sciences Inc. for an undisclosed amount. Maxion's quantum cascade laser and interband cascade laser lines were integrated into Thorlabs's TQE facility.

In January 2013, Thorlabs purchased the iGuide optical fiber product line from IRphotonics, relocating production from Montreal to company headquarters in Newton. In a statement, the company said the Maxion and iGuide purchases were part of an effort "to become a vertical manufacturer" in the infrared equipment market. In June, the company acquired scientific digital imaging company Digital Video Camera (DVC). DVC remained in Austin, Texas, operating under the name Thorlabs Scientific Imaging. In October, Thorlabs acquired cytometry manufacturer CompuCyte, relocating the Westwood, Massachusetts company's operations to Sterling, Virginia.

In March 2014, Thorlabs expanded into optoelectronics, opening a new facility in Ann Arbor, Michigan. In May, it expanded operations into Canada with a new research and development and manufacturing facility in Montreal. The new subsidiary operates under the name Thorlabs Canada ULC in partnership with École Polytechnique de Montréal and the University of Montreal to serve as another manufacturing facility of Thorlabs products. In 2014, Thorlabs acquired Corning Inc.'s line of quantum cascade lasers and entered into a partnership with Daylight Solutions to produce the laser for defense and security applications. In 2015, Thorlabs acquired Pantec's line of Elliptec product line. In 2018, Thorlabs acquired Norland Products' line of fiber optic products. From 2015 to present, Thorlabs has acquired the following companies: Vytran, Cirtemo, Coda Devices, OPTEK, KMLabs, and Crystalline Mirror Solutions.

== Business model ==
Thorlabs designs and manufactures products in the areas of fiber optics, lasers, optical instrumentation, optomechanics, photonics, and vibration isolation. Approximately 90% of its products are manufactured in-house. "I see much greater value in a business that designs, manufactures and distributes, rather than a pure distribution model", Cable explained. "[Controlling the design process] allows us to be an agile competitor on price and also on innovating the product." Roughly 30% of the products were created in response to, or inspired by, customer requests. Although products used to be sold primarily through a print catalog, Thorlabs now emphasizes selling catalog products and communicating with customers through its website.

According to Cable, his time spent working as an engineer and being "a customer of all of [his] major competitors" gave him an intimate understanding of the market that has led to his success. Thorlabs puts a strong emphasis on customer service, aiming to ship products the same day orders are received. Cable has declined to move manufacturing to China or another cheap market in order to maintain the quick delivery schedule, and also because labor is not a significant portion of Thorlabs' costs. The company is privately held, but Cable has said he is not against the possibility of a future initial public offering.

Thorlabs operates a Strategic Partnership Program which supports start-up manufacturers through shared knowledge and resources in exchange for an equity stake in the new company. Additionally, the program helps Thorlabs stay on top of market trends as emerging technologies account for roughly 25% of its annual revenue.
