= Optical tweezers =

Scientific instruments

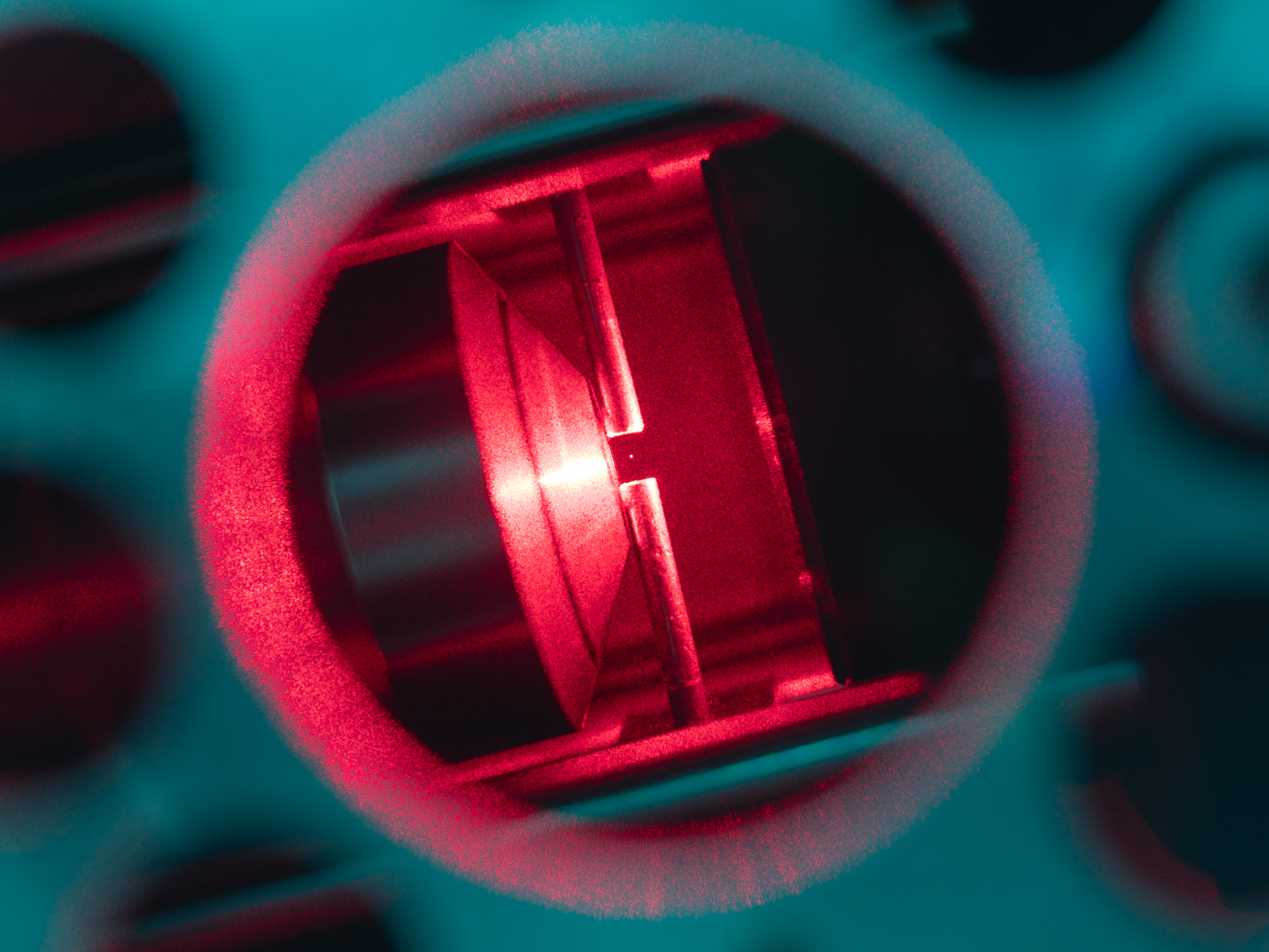
A photograph of a nanoparticle (diameter 103 nm) trapped by an optical tweezer. The nanoparticle can be seen as the tiny bright spot in the middle. For additional control two copper electrodes are placed above and below the particle.

Optical tweezers (originally called single-beam gradient force trap) are scientific instruments that use a highly focused laser beam to hold and move microscopic and sub-microscopic objects like atoms, nanoparticles and droplets, in a manner similar to tweezers. If the object is held in air or vacuum without additional support, it can be called optical levitation.

The laser light provides an attractive or repulsive force (typically on the order of piconewtons), depending on the relative refractive index between particle and surrounding medium. Levitation is possible if the force of the light counters the force of gravity. The trapped particles are usually micron-sized, or even smaller. Dielectric and absorbing particles can be trapped, too.

Optical tweezers are used in biology and medicine (for example to grab and hold a single bacterium, a cell like a sperm cell or a blood cell, or a molecule like DNA), nanoengineering and nanochemistry (to study and build materials from single molecules), quantum optics and quantum optomechanics (to study the interaction of single particles with light). The development of optical tweezing by Arthur Ashkin was lauded with the 2018 Nobel Prize in Physics.

== History and development ==
The detection of optical scattering and the gradient forces on micron sized particles was first reported in 1970 by Arthur Ashkin, a scientist working at Bell Labs. Years later, Ashkin and colleagues reported the first observation of what is now commonly referred to as an optical tweezer: a tightly focused beam of light capable of holding microscopic particles stable in three dimensions. In 2018, Ashkin was awarded the Nobel Prize in Physics for this development.

One author of this seminal 1986 paper, Steven Chu, would go on to use optical tweezing in his work on cooling and trapping neutral atoms. This research earned Chu the 1997 Nobel Prize in Physics along with Claude Cohen-Tannoudji and William D. Phillips. In an interview, Steven Chu described how Ashkin had first envisioned optical tweezing as a method for trapping atoms. Ashkin was able to trap larger particles (10 to 10,000 nanometers in diameter) but it fell to Chu to extend these techniques to the trapping of neutral atoms (0.1 nanometers in diameter) using resonant laser light and a magnetic gradient trap (cf. Magneto-optical trap).

In the late 1980s, Arthur Ashkin and Joseph M. Dziedzic demonstrated the first application of the technology to the biological sciences, using it to trap an individual tobacco mosaic virus and Escherichia coli bacterium. Throughout the 1990s and afterwards, researchers like Carlos Bustamante, James Spudich, and Steven Block pioneered the use of optical trap force spectroscopy to characterize molecular-scale biological motors. These molecular motors are ubiquitous in biology, and are responsible for locomotion and mechanical action within the cell. Optical traps allowed these biophysicists to observe the forces and dynamics of nanoscale motors at the single-molecule level; optical trap force-spectroscopy has since led to greater understanding of the stochastic nature of these force-generating molecules. These approaches was later applied to study forces associated with conformational changes of biomolecules, and in particular protein folding and molecular chaperones.

Optical tweezers have proven useful in other areas of biology as well. They are used in synthetic biology to construct tissue-like networks of artificial cells, and to fuse synthetic membranes together to initiate biochemical reactions. They are also widely employed in genetic studies and research on chromosome structure and dynamics. In 2003 the techniques of optical tweezers were applied in the field of cell sorting; by creating a large optical intensity pattern over the sample area, cells can be sorted by their intrinsic optical characteristics. Optical tweezers have also been used to probe the cytoskeleton, measure the visco-elastic properties of biopolymers,, organelles, and cells. A bio-molecular assay in which clusters of ligand coated nano-particles are both optically trapped and optically detected after target molecule induced clustering was proposed in 2011 and experimentally demonstrated in 2013.

However, optical tweezers are not without some drawbacks in biological studies. Due to the high light fluences usually necessary to achieve trapping, the samples are exposed to very high light intensities (10^{6} - 10^{9} W/cm^{−2}). These can lead to undesirable photothermal and/or photochemical effects. Also, reactive oxygen species (ROS) can be produced in high amounts. Therefore, researchers must be aware of these issues when planning and discussing biological experiments which make use of optical tweezers.

Optical tweezers are also used to trap laser-cooled atoms in vacuum, mainly for applications in quantum science. Some achievements in this area include trapping of a single atom in 2001, trapping of 2D arrays of atoms in 2002, trapping of strongly interacting entangled pairs in 2010, trapping precisely assembled 2-dimensional arrays of atoms in 2016 and 3-dimensional arrays in 2018. These techniques have been used in quantum simulators to obtain programmable arrays of 196 and 256 atoms in 2021 and represent a promising platform for quantum computing.

Researchers have worked to convert optical tweezers from large, complex instruments to smaller, simpler ones, for use by those with smaller research budgets.

== Physics ==
Dielectric objects are attracted to the center of the beam, slightly above the beam waist, as described in the text. The force applied on the object depends linearly on its displacement from the trap center just as with a simple spring system. It is a restoring force and thus equal to $-k_\mathrm{trap} x$.

=== General description ===
Optical tweezers are capable of manipulating nanometer and micron-sized dielectric particles, and even individual atoms, by exerting extremely small forces via a highly focused laser beam. The beam is typically focused by sending it through a microscope objective. Near the narrowest point of the focused beam, known as the beam waist, the amplitude of the oscillating electric field varies rapidly in space. Dielectric particles are attracted along the gradient to the region of strongest electric field, which is the center of the beam. The laser light also tends to apply a force on particles in the beam along the direction of beam propagation. This is due to conservation of momentum: photons that are absorbed or scattered by the tiny dielectric particle impart momentum to the dielectric particle. This is known as the scattering force and results in the particle being displaced slightly downstream from the exact position of the beam waist, as seen in the figure.

Optical traps are very sensitive instruments and are capable of the manipulation and detection of sub-nanometer displacements for sub-micron dielectric particles. For this reason, they are often used to manipulate and study single molecules by interacting with a bead that has been attached to that molecule. Folding and interactions of DNA and the proteins are commonly studied in this way.

For quantitative scientific measurements, most optical traps are operated in such a way that the dielectric particle rarely moves far from the trap center. The reason for this is that the force applied to the particle is linear with respect to its displacement from the center of the trap as long as the displacement is small. In this way, an optical trap can be compared to a simple spring, which follows Hooke's law.

=== Detailed view ===
Proper explanation of optical trapping behavior depends upon the size of the trapped particle relative to the wavelength of light used to trap it. In cases where the dimensions of the particle are much greater than the wavelength, a simple ray optics treatment is sufficient. If the wavelength of light far exceeds the particle dimensions, the particles can be treated as electric dipoles in an electric field. For optical trapping of dielectric objects of dimensions within an order of magnitude of the trapping beam wavelength, the only accurate models involve the treatment of either time dependent or time harmonic Maxwell equations using appropriate boundary conditions.

==== Ray optics ====
Ray optics explanation (unfocused laser). When the bead is displaced from the beam center (right image), the larger momentum change of the more intense rays cause a net force to be applied back toward the center of the laser. When the bead is laterally centered on the beam (left image), the resulting lateral force is zero. But an unfocused laser still causes a force pointing away from the laser.

Ray optics explanation (focused laser). In addition to keeping the bead in the center of the laser, a focused laser also keeps the bead in a fixed axial position: The momentum change of the focused rays causes a force towards the laser focus, both when the bead is in front (left image) or behind (right image) the laser focus. So, the bead will stay slightly behind the focus, where this force compensates the scattering force.

In cases where the diameter of a trapped particle is significantly greater than the wavelength of light, the trapping phenomenon can be explained using ray optics. As shown in the figure, individual rays of light emitted from the laser will be refracted as it enters and exits the dielectric bead. As a result, the ray will exit in a direction different from which it originated. Since light has a momentum associated with it, this change in direction indicates that its momentum has changed. Due to Newton's third law, there should be an equal and opposite momentum change on the particle.

Most optical traps operate with a Gaussian beam (TEM_{00} mode) profile intensity. In this case, if the particle is displaced from the center of the beam, as in the right part of the figure, the particle has a net force returning it to the center of the trap because more intense beams impart a larger momentum change towards the center of the trap than less intense beams, which impart a smaller momentum change away from the trap center. The net momentum change, or force, returns the particle to the trap center.

If the particle is located at the center of the beam, then individual rays of light are refracting through the particle symmetrically, resulting in no net lateral force. The net force in this case is along the axial direction of the trap, which cancels out the scattering force of the laser light. The cancellation of this axial gradient force with the scattering force is what causes the bead to be stably trapped slightly downstream of the beam waist.

The standard tweezers works with the trapping laser propagated in the direction of gravity and the inverted tweezers works against gravity.

==== Electric dipole approximation ====
In cases where the diameter of a trapped particle is significantly smaller than the wavelength of light, the conditions for Rayleigh scattering are satisfied and the particle can be treated as a point dipole in an inhomogeneous electromagnetic field. The force applied on a single charge in an electromagnetic field is known as the Lorentz force,

$$\mathbf{F_1}=q\left(\mathbf{E}(\mathbf{x}_1)+\frac{d\mathbf{x_1}}{dt}\times\mathbf{B}\right).$$

The force on the dipole can be calculated by substituting two terms for the electric field in the equation above, one for each charge. The polarization of a dipole is $\mathbf{p}=q\mathbf{d},$ where $\mathbf{d}$ is the distance between the two charges. For a point dipole, the distance is infinitesimal, $\mathbf{x}_1-\mathbf{x}_2.$ Taking into account that the two charges have opposite signs, the force takes the form

$$\begin{align}
\mathbf{F} & = q\left(\mathbf{E}(\mathbf{x}_1)-\mathbf{E}(\mathbf{x}_2)+\frac{d(\mathbf{x}_1-\mathbf{x}_2)}{dt}\times\mathbf{B}\right) \\
& = q\left(\mathbf{E}(\mathbf{x}_1)+\left((\mathbf{x}_1-\mathbf{x}_2)\cdot\nabla\right)\mathbf{E}-\mathbf{E}(\mathbf{x}_1)+\frac{d(\mathbf{x}_1-\mathbf{x}_2)}{dt}\times\mathbf{B}\right). \\
\end{align}$$

Notice that the $\mathbf{E_1}$ cancel out. Multiplying through by the charge, $q$, converts position, $\mathbf{x}$, into polarization, $\mathbf{p}$,

$$\begin{align}
\mathbf{F} & = \left(\mathbf{p}\cdot\nabla\right)\mathbf{E}+\frac{d\mathbf{p}}{dt}\times\mathbf{B} \\
& = \alpha\left[\left(\mathbf{E}\cdot\nabla\right)\mathbf{E}+\frac{d\mathbf{E}}{dt}\times\mathbf{B}\right], \\
\end{align}$$

where in the second equality, it has been assumed that the dielectric particle is linear (i.e. $\mathbf{p}=\alpha\mathbf{E}$).

In the final steps, two equalities will be used: (1) a vector analysis equality, (2) Faraday's law of induction.

1. $\left(\mathbf{E}\cdot\nabla\right)\mathbf{E}=\nabla\left(\frac{1}{2}E^2\right)-\mathbf{E}\times\left(\nabla\times\mathbf{E}\right)$
2. $\nabla\times\mathbf{E}=-\frac{\partial\mathbf{B}}{\partial t}$

First, the vector equality will be inserted for the first term in the force equation above. Maxwell's equation will be substituted in for the second term in the vector equality. Then the two terms which contain time derivatives can be combined into a single term.

$$\begin{align}
\mathbf{F} & = \alpha\left[\frac{1}{2}\nabla E^2-\mathbf{E}\times\left(\nabla\times\mathbf{E}\right)+\frac{d\mathbf{E}}{dt}\times\mathbf{B}\right] \\
& = \alpha\left[\frac{1}{2}\nabla E^2-\mathbf{E}\times\left(-\frac{d\mathbf{B}}{dt}\right)+\frac{d\mathbf{E}}{dt}\times\mathbf{B}\right] \\
& = \alpha\left[\frac{1}{2}\nabla E^2+\frac{d}{dt}\left(\mathbf{E}\times\mathbf{B}\right)\right]. \\
\end{align}$$

The second term in the last equality is the time derivative of a quantity that is related through a multiplicative constant to the Poynting vector, which describes the power per unit area passing through a surface. Since the power of the laser is constant when sampling over frequencies much longer than the frequency of the laser's light ~10^{14} Hz, the derivative of this term averages to zero and the force can be written as

$$\mathbf{F}=\frac{1}{2}\alpha\nabla E^2 = \frac{2 \pi n_1 a^3}{c}\left(\frac{m^2 - 1}{m^2 + 2}\right) \nabla I(\mathbf{r}),$$

where in the second part we have included the induced dipole moment (in MKS units) of a spherical dielectric particle: $\mathbf{p} = \alpha \mathbf{E}(\mathbf{r},t) = 4 \pi n_1^2 \epsilon_0 a^3 (m^2 - 1)/(m^2 + 2) \mathbf{E}(\mathbf{r},t)$, where $a$ is the particle radius, $n_0$ is the index of refraction of the particle and $m = n_0/n_1$ is the relative refractive index between the particle and the medium. The square of the magnitude of the electric field is equal to the intensity of the beam as a function of position. Therefore, the result indicates that the force on the dielectric particle, when treated as a point dipole, is proportional to the gradient along the intensity of the beam. In other words, the gradient force described here tends to attract the particle to the region of highest intensity. In reality, the scattering force of the light works against the gradient force in the axial direction of the trap, resulting in an equilibrium position that is displaced slightly downstream of the intensity maximum. Under the Rayleigh approximation, we can also write the scattering force as

$$\mathbf{F}_{\text{scat}}(\mathbf{r}) = \frac{k^4 \alpha^2}{6 \pi c n_0^3\epsilon_0^2} I(\mathbf{r}) \hat{z} = \frac{8 \pi n_0 k^4 a^6}{3 c} \left(\frac{m^2 - 1}{m^2 + 2}\right)^2 I(\mathbf{r}) \hat{z}.$$

Since the scattering is isotropic, the net momentum is transferred in the forward direction. On the quantum level, we picture the gradient force as forward Rayleigh scattering in which identical photons are created and annihilated concurrently, while in the scattering (radiation) force the incident photons travel in the same direction and 'scatter' isotropically. By conservation of momentum, the particle must accumulate the photons' original momenta, causing a forward force in the latter.

==== Harmonic potential approximation ====
A useful way to study the interaction of an atom in a Gaussian beam is to look at the harmonic potential approximation of the intensity profile the atom experiences. In the case of the two-level atom, the potential experienced is related to its AC Stark Shift,

$$\mathbf{\Delta E}_{\text{AC Stark}} = \frac{3 \pi c^2 \Gamma}{2 \omega_0^3 \delta} \mathbf{I(r,z)}$$

where $\Gamma$ is the natural line width of the excited state, $\mu$ is the electric dipole coupling, $\omega_o$ is the frequency of the transition, and $\delta$ is the detuning or difference between the laser frequency and the transition frequency.

The intensity of a gaussian beam profile is characterized by the wavelength $(\lambda)$, minimum waist $(w_o)$, and power of the beam $(P_o)$. The following formulas define the beam profile:

$$I(r,z)=I_0 \left (\frac{w_0}{w(z)}\right ) ^2 e^{-\frac{2 r^2}{w^2(z)}}$$

$$w(z)=w_0 \sqrt{1+\left(\frac{z}{z_R}\right)^2}$$

$$z_R = \frac{\pi w_0^2}{\lambda}$$

$$P_0 = \frac{1}{2} \pi I_0 w_0^2$$

To approximate this Gaussian potential in both the radial and axial directions of the beam, the intensity profile must be expanded to second order in $z$ and $r$ for $r=0$ and $z=0$ respectively and equated to the harmonic potential $\frac{1}{2}m(\omega_z^2 z^2 + \omega_r^2 r^2)$. These expansions are evaluated assuming fixed power.

$$\frac{1}{2!}\frac{\partial^2 U}{\partial z^2} \Biggr |_{r,z=0}z^2=\frac{\alpha}{2\epsilon_{0} c} \frac{2 P_0 \lambda^2}{\pi^3 w_0^6} z^2=\frac12 m \omega_z^2 z^2$$

$$\frac{1}{2!}\frac{\partial^2 U}{\partial r^2} \Biggr |_{r,z=0}r^2=\frac{\alpha}{2\epsilon_{0} c}\frac{4 P_0}{\pi w_0^4} r^2=\frac12 m \omega_r^2 r^2$$

This means that when solving for the harmonic frequencies (or trap frequencies when considering optical traps for atoms), the frequencies are given as:

$$\omega_r = \sqrt{\frac{4 \alpha P_0}{\pi \epsilon_{0} cm w_0^4}}$$

$$\omega_z = \sqrt{\frac{2 \alpha P_0\lambda^2}{m \pi^3 \epsilon_0 c w_0^6}}$$

so that the relative trap frequencies for the radial and axial directions as a function of only beam waist scale as:

$$\frac{\omega_r}{\omega_z}=\sqrt{2}\frac{w_0 \pi}{\lambda}$$

=== Optical levitation ===
In order to levitate the particle in air, the downward force of gravity must be countered by the forces stemming from photon momentum transfer. Typically photon radiation pressure of a focused laser beam of enough intensity counters the downward force of gravity while also preventing lateral (side to side) and vertical instabilities to allow for a stable optical trap capable of holding small particles in suspension.

Micrometer sized (from several to 50 micrometers in diameter) transparent dielectric spheres such as fused silica spheres, oil or water droplets, are used in this type of experiment. The laser radiation can be fixed in wavelength such as that of an argon ion laser or that of a tunable dye laser. Laser power required is of the order of 1 Watt focused to a spot size of several tens of micrometers. Phenomena related to morphology-dependent resonances in a spherical optical cavity have been studied by several research groups.

For a shiny object, such as a metallic micro-sphere, stable optical levitation has not been achieved. Optical levitation of a macroscopic object is also theoretically possible, and can be enhanced with nano-structuring.

Materials that have been successfully levitated include Black liquor, aluminum oxide, tungsten, and nickel.

=== Optothermal tweezers ===
In the last two decades, optical forces are combined with thermophoretic forces to enable trapping at reduced laser powers, thus resulting in minimized photon damage. By introducing light-absorbing elements (either particles or substrates), microscale temperature gradients are created, resulting in thermophoresis. Typically, particles (including biological objects such as cells, bacteria, DNA/RNA) drift towards the cold - resulting in particle repulsion using optical tweezers. Overcoming this limitation, different techniques such as beam shaping and solution modification with electrolytes and surfactants were used to successfully trap the objects. Laser cooling was also achieved with Ytterbium-doped yttrium lithium fluoride crystals to generate cold spots using lasers to achieve trapping with reduced photobleaching. The sample temperature has also been reduced to achieve optical trapping for a significantly increased selection of particles using optothermal tweezers for drug delivery applications.

== Setups ==
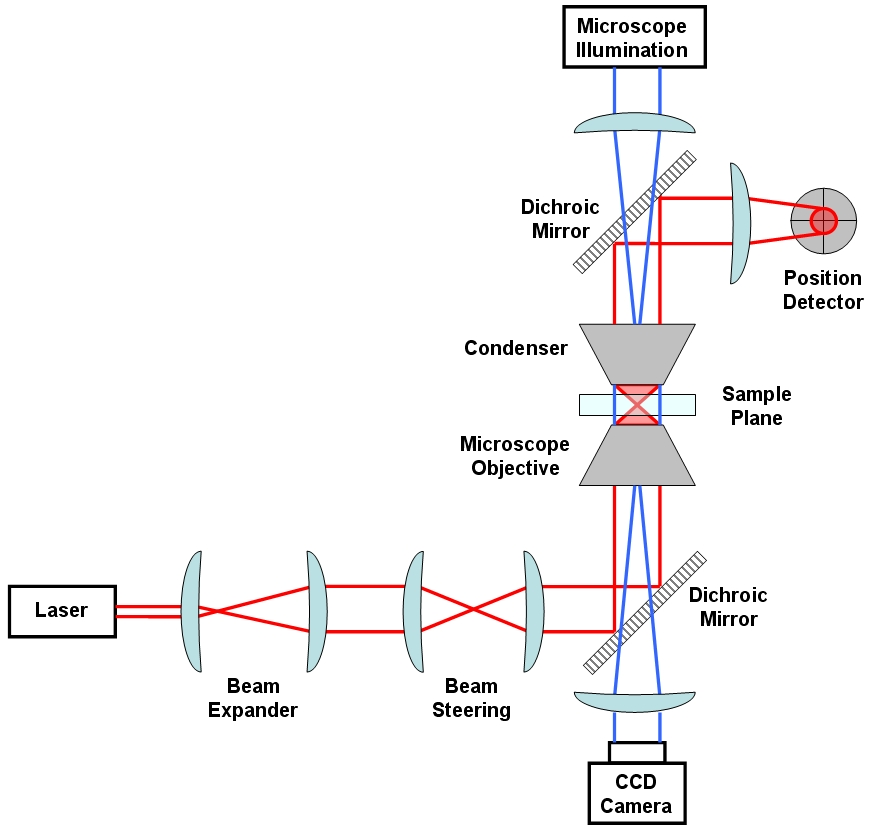
A generic optical tweezer diagram with only the most basic components.

The most basic optical tweezer setup will likely include the following components: a laser (usually Nd:YAG), a beam expander, some optics used to steer the beam location in the sample plane, a microscope objective and condenser to create the trap in the sample plane, a position detector (e.g. quadrant photodiode) to measure beam displacements and a microscope illumination source coupled to a CCD camera (typically via an optical mount.

An Nd:YAG laser (1064 nm wavelength) is a common choice of laser for working with biological specimens. This is because such specimens (being mostly water) have a low absorption coefficient at this wavelength. A low absorption is advisable so as to minimise damage to the biological material, sometimes referred to as opticution. Perhaps the most important consideration in optical tweezer design is the choice of the objective. A stable trap requires that the gradient force, which is dependent upon the numerical aperture (NA) of the objective, be greater than the scattering force. Suitable objectives typically have an NA between 1.2 and 1.4.

While alternatives are available, perhaps the simplest method for position detection involves imaging the trapping laser exiting the sample chamber onto a quadrant photodiode. Lateral deflections of the beam are measured similarly to how it is done using atomic force microscopy (AFM).

Expanding the beam emitted from the laser to fill the aperture of the objective will result in a tighter, diffraction-limited spot. While lateral translation of the trap relative to the sample can be accomplished by translation of the microscope slide, most tweezer setups have additional optics designed to translate the beam to give an extra degree of translational freedom. This can be done by translating the first of the two lenses labelled as "Beam Steering" in the figure. For example, translation of that lens in the lateral plane will result in a laterally deflected beam from what is drawn in the figure. If the distance between the beam steering lenses and the objective is chosen properly, this will correspond to a similar deflection before entering the objective and a resulting lateral translation in the sample plane. The position of the beam waist, that is the focus of the optical trap, can be adjusted by an axial displacement of the initial lens. Such an axial displacement causes the beam to diverge or converge slightly, the result of which is an axially displaced position of the beam waist in the sample chamber.

Visualization of the sample plane is usually accomplished through illumination via a separate light source coupled into the optical path in the opposite direction using dichroic mirrors. This light is incident on a CCD camera and can be viewed on an external monitor or used for tracking the trapped particle position via video tracking.

=== Alternative laser beam modes ===
The majority of optical tweezers make use of conventional TEM_{00} Gaussian beams. However a number of other beam types have been used to trap particles, including high order laser beams i.e. Hermite-Gaussian beams (TEM_{xy}), Laguerre-Gaussian (LG) beams (TEM_{pl}) and Bessel beams.

Optical tweezers based on Laguerre-Gaussian beams have the unique capability of trapping particles that are optically reflective and absorptive. Laguerre-Gaussian beams also possess a well-defined orbital angular momentum that can rotate particles. This is accomplished without external mechanical or electrical steering of the beam.

Both zero and higher order Bessel Beams also possess a unique tweezing ability. They can trap and rotate multiple particles that are millimeters apart and even around obstacles.

Micromachines can be driven by these unique optical beams due to their intrinsic rotating mechanism due to the spin and orbital angular momentum of light.

=== Multiplexed optical tweezers ===
A typical setup uses one laser to create one or two traps. Commonly, two traps are generated by splitting the laser beam into two orthogonally polarized beams. Optical tweezing operations with more than two traps can be realized either by time-sharing a single laser beam among several optical tweezers, or by diffractively splitting the beam into multiple traps. With acousto-optic deflectors or galvanometer-driven mirrors, a single laser beam can be shared among hundreds of optical tweezers in the focal plane, or else spread into an extended one-dimensional trap. Specially designed diffractive optical elements can divide a single input beam into hundreds of continuously illuminated traps in arbitrary three-dimensional configurations. The trap-forming hologram also can specify the mode structure of each trap individually, thereby creating arrays of optical vortices, optical tweezers, and holographic line traps, for example. When implemented with a spatial light modulator, such holographic optical traps also can move objects in three dimensions. Advanced forms of holographic optical traps with arbitrary spatial profiles, where smoothness of the intensity and the phase are controlled, find applications in many areas of science, from micromanipulation to ultracold atoms. Ultracold atoms could also be used for realization of quantum computers.

=== Single mode optical fibers ===
The standard fiber optical trap relies on the same principle as the optical trapping, but with the Gaussian laser beam delivered through an optical fiber. If one end of the optical fiber is molded into a lens-like facet, the nearly gaussian beam carried by a single mode standard fiber will be focused at some distance from the fiber tip. The effective Numerical Aperture of such assembly is usually not enough to allow for a full 3D optical trap but only for a 2D trap (optical trapping and manipulation of objects will be possible only when, e.g., they are in contact with a surface ). A true 3D optical trapping based on a single fiber, with a trapping point which is not in nearly contact with the fiber tip, has been realized based on a not-standard annular-core fiber arrangement and a total-internal-reflection geometry.

On the other hand, if the ends of the fiber are not moulded, the laser exiting the fiber will be diverging and thus a stable optical trap can only be realised by balancing the gradient and the scattering force from two opposing ends of the fiber. The gradient force will trap the particles in the transverse direction, while the axial optical force comes from the scattering force of the two counter propagating beams emerging from the two fibers. The equilibrium z-position of such a trapped bead is where the two scattering forces equal each other. This work was pioneered by A. Constable et al., Opt. Lett. 18,1867 (1993), and followed by J.Guck et al., Phys. Rev. Lett. 84, 5451 (2000), who made use of this technique to stretch microparticles. By manipulating the input power into the two ends of the fiber, there will be an increase of an "optical stretching" that can be used to measure viscoelastic properties of cells, with sensitivity sufficient to distinguish between different individual cytoskeletal phenotypes. i.e. human erythrocytes and mouse fibroblasts.

=== Multimode fiber-based traps ===
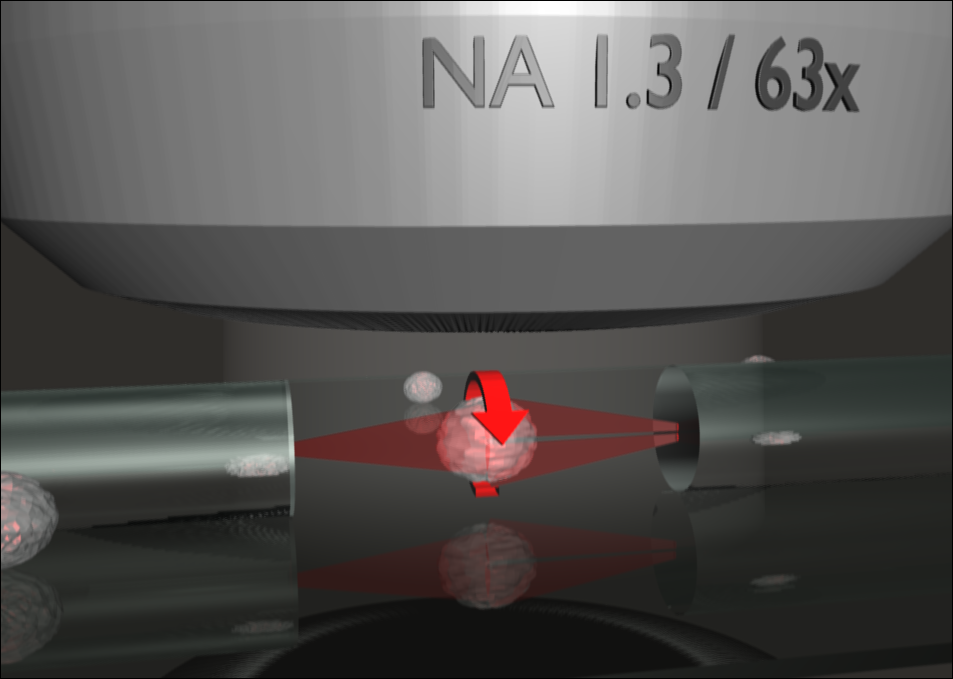
The Optical Cell Rotator is a fiber based laser trap that can hold and precisely orient living cells for tomographic microscopy.

"Optical cell rotator" (OCR) technology decouples trapping from imaging optics. This, its modular design, and the high compatibility of divergent laser traps with biological material indicates the great potential of this new generation of laser traps in medical research and life science. Based on adaptive optics, OCR allows dynamic reconfiguring of the optical trap during operation and adapting it to the sample.

=== Cell sorting ===
One of the more common cell-sorting systems makes use of flow cytometry through fluorescence imaging. In this method, a suspension of biologic cells is sorted into two or more containers, based upon specific fluorescent characteristics of each cell during an assisted flow. By using an electrical charge that the cell is "trapped" in, the cells are then sorted based on the fluorescence intensity measurements. The sorting process is undertaken by an electrostatic deflection system that diverts cells into containers based upon their charge.

In the optically actuated sorting process, the cells are flowed through into an optical landscape i.e. 2D or 3D optical lattices. Without any induced electrical charge, the cells would sort based on their intrinsic refractive index properties and can be re-configurability for dynamic sorting. An optical lattice can be created using diffractive optics and optical elements.

On the other hand, K. Ladavac et al. used a spatial light modulator to project an intensity pattern to enable the optical sorting process. K. Xiao and D. G. Grier applied holographic video microscopy to demonstrate that this technique can sort colloidal spheres with part-per-thousand resolution for size and refractive index.

The main mechanism for sorting is the arrangement of the optical lattice points. As the cell flow through the optical lattice, there are forces due to the particles drag force that is competing directly with the optical gradient force (See Physics of optical tweezers) from the optical lattice point. By shifting the arrangement of the optical lattice point, there is a preferred optical path where the optical forces are dominant and biased. With the aid of the flow of the cells, there is a resultant force that is directed along that preferred optical path. Hence, there is a relationship of the flow rate with the optical gradient force. By adjusting the two forces, one will be able to obtain a good optical sorting efficiency.

Competition of the forces in the sorting environment need fine tuning to succeed in high efficient optical sorting. The need is mainly with regards to the balance of the forces; drag force due to fluid flow and optical gradient force due to arrangement of intensity spot.

Scientists at the University of St. Andrews have received considerable funding from the UK Engineering and Physical Sciences Research Council (EPSRC) for an optical sorting machine. This new technology could rival the conventional fluorescence-activated cell sorting.

=== Evanescent fields ===
An evanescent field is a residue optical field that "leaks" during total internal reflection. This "leaking" of light fades off at an exponential rate. The evanescent field has found a number of applications in nanometer resolution imaging (microscopy); optical micromanipulation (optical tweezers) are becoming ever more relevant in research.

In optical tweezers, a continuous evanescent field can be created when light is propagating through an optical waveguide (multiple total internal reflection). The resulting evanescent field has a directional sense and will propel microparticles along its propagating path. This work was first pioneered by S. Kawata and T. Sugiura, in 1992, who showed that the field can be coupled to the particles in proximity on the order of 100 nanometers. This direct coupling of the field is treated as a type of photon tunnelling across the gap from prism to microparticles. The result is a directional optical propelling force.

The evanescent field generated by mid-infrared laser has been used to sort particles by molecular vibrational resonance selectively. Mid-infrared light is commonly used to identify molecular structures of materials because the vibrational modes exist in the mid-infrared region. Optical force enhancement by molecular vibrational resonance can be achieved by exciting the stretching mode of Si-O-Si bond at 9.3 μm. It is shown that silica microspheres containing significant Si-O-Si bond move up to ten times faster than polystyrene microspheres due to molecular vibrational resonance. Moreover, this same group also investigated the possibility of optical force chromatography based on molecular vibrational resonance.

Surface plasmons, an enhanced evanescent wave localized at a metal/dielectric interface has been demonstrated using a photonic force microscope, the total force magnitude being found 40 times stronger compared to a normal evanescent wave. By patterning the surface with gold microscopic islands it is possible to have selective and parallel trapping in these islands. The forces of the latter optical tweezers lie in the femtonewton range.

The evanescent field can also be used to trap cold atoms and molecules near the surface of an optical waveguide or optical nanofiber.

=== Indirect approach ===
Ming Wu, a UC Berkeley Professor of electrical engineering and computer sciences invented the new optoelectronic tweezers.

Wu transformed the optical energy from low powered light emitting diodes (LED) into electrical energy via a photoconductive surface. The idea is to allow the LED to switch on and off the photoconductive material via its fine projection. As the optical pattern can be easily transformable through optical projection, this method allows a high flexibility of switching different optical landscapes.

The manipulation/tweezing process is done by the variations between the electric field actuated by the light pattern. The particles will be either attracted or repelled from the actuated point due to its induced electrical dipole. Particles suspended in a liquid will be susceptible to the electrical field gradient, this is known as dielectrophoresis.

One clear advantage is that the electrical conductivity is different between different kinds of cells. Living cells have a lower conductive medium while the dead ones have minimum or no conductive medium. The system may be able to manipulate roughly 10,000 cells or particles at the same time.

See comments by Professor Kishan Dholakia on this new technique, K. Dholakia, Nature Materials 4, 579–580 (01 Aug 2005) News and Views.

"The system was able to move live E. coli bacteria and 20-micrometre-wide particles, using an optical power output of less than 10 microwatts. This is one-hundred-thousandth of the power needed for [direct] optical tweezers".

Another notably new type of optical tweezers is optothermal tweezers invented by Yuebing Zheng at The University of Texas at Austin. The strategy is to use light to create a temperature gradient and exploit the thermophoretic migration of matter for optical trapping. The team further integrated thermophoresis with laser cooling to develop opto-refrigerative tweezers to avoid thermal damages for noninvasive optical trapping and manipulation.

=== Optical binding ===
When a cluster of microparticles are trapped within a monochromatic laser beam, the organization of the microparticles within the optical trapping is heavily dependent on the redistributing of the optical trapping forces amongst the microparticles. This redistribution of light forces amongst the cluster of microparticles provides a new force equilibrium on the cluster as a whole. As such we can say that the cluster of microparticles are somewhat bound together by light. One of the first experimental evidence of optical binding was reported by Michael M. Burns, Jean-Marc Fournier, and Jene A. Golovchenko, though it was originally predicted by T. Thirunamachandran.

=== Fluorescence optical tweezers ===
In order to simultaneously manipulate and image samples that exhibit fluorescence, optical tweezers can be built alongside a fluorescence microscope. Such instruments are particularly useful when it comes to studying single or small numbers of biological molecules that have been fluorescently labelled, or in applications in which fluorescence is used to track and visualize objects that are to be trapped.

This approach has been extended for simultaneous sensing and imaging of dynamic protein complexes using long and strong tethers generated by a highly efficient multi-step enzymatic approach and applied to investigations of disaggregation machines in action.

== See also ==
- Atom optics
- Levitation
- List of laser articles
- Quantum control
- Quantum optics
