= Force spectroscopy =

Set of scientific techniques

Force spectroscopy is a set of techniques for the study of the interactions and the binding forces between individual molecules. These methods can be used to measure the mechanical properties of single polymer molecules or proteins, or individual chemical bonds. The name "force spectroscopy", although widely used in the scientific community, is somewhat misleading, because there is no true matter-radiation interaction.

Techniques that can be used to perform force spectroscopy include atomic force microscopy, optical tweezers, magnetic tweezers, acoustic force spectroscopy, microneedles, and biomembranes.

Force spectroscopy measures the behavior of a molecule under stretching or torsional mechanical force. In this way a great deal has been learned in recent years about the mechanochemical coupling in the enzymes responsible for muscle contraction, transport in the cell, energy generation (F1-ATPase), DNA replication and transcription (polymerases), DNA unknotting and unwinding (topoisomerases and helicases).

As a single-molecule technique, as opposed to typical ensemble spectroscopies, it allows a researcher to determine properties of the particular molecule under study. In particular, rare events such as conformational change, which are masked in an ensemble, may be observed.

== Experimental techniques ==
There are many ways to accurately manipulate single molecules. Prominent among these are optical or magnetic tweezers, atomic-force-microscope (AFM) cantilevers and acoustic force spectroscopy. In all of these techniques, a biomolecule, such as protein or DNA, or some other biopolymer has one end bound to a surface or micrometre-sized bead and the other to a force sensor. The force sensor is usually a micrometre-sized bead or a cantilever, whose displacement can be measured to determine the force.

=== Atomic force microscope cantilevers ===
Molecules adsorbed on a surface are picked up by a microscopic tip (nanometres wide) that is located on the end of an elastic cantilever. In a more sophisticated version of this experiment (Chemical Force Microscopy) the tips are covalently functionalized with the molecules of interest. A piezoelectric controller then pulls up the cantilever. If some force is acting on the elastic cantilever (for example because some molecule is being stretched between the surface and the tip), this will deflect upward (repulsive force) or downward (attractive force). According to Hooke's law, this deflection will be proportional to the force acting on the cantilever. Deflection is measured by the position of a laser beam reflected by the cantilever. This kind of set-up can measure forces as low as 10 pN (10^{−11} N), the fundamental resolution limit is given by the cantilever's thermal noise.

The so-called force curve is the graph of force (or more precisely, of cantilever deflection) versus the piezoelectric position on the Z axis. An ideal Hookean spring, for example, would display a straight diagonal force curve. Typically, the force curves observed in the force spectroscopy experiments consist of a contact (diagonal) region where the probe contacts the sample surface, and a non-contact region where the probe is off the sample surface. When the restoring force of the cantilever exceeds tip-sample adhesion force the probe jumps out of contact, and the magnitude of this jump is often used as a measure of adhesion force or rupture force. In general the rupture of a tip-surface bond is a stochastic process; therefore reliable quantification of the adhesion force requires taking multiple individual force curves. The histogram of the adhesion forces obtained in these multiple measurements provides the main data output for force spectroscopy measurement.

In biophysics, single-molecule force spectroscopy can be used to study the energy landscape underlying the interaction between two bio-molecules, like proteins. Here, one binding partner can be attached to a cantilever tip via a flexible linker molecule (PEG chain), while the other one is immobilized on a substrate surface. In a typical approach, the cantilever is repeatedly approached and retracted from the sample at a constant speed. In some cases, binding between the two partners will occur, which will become visible in the force curve, as the use of a flexible linker gives rise to a characteristic curve shape (see Worm-like chain model) distinct from adhesion. The collected rupture forces can then be analysed as a function of the bond loading rate. The resulting graph of the average rupture force as a function of the loading rate is called the force spectrum and forms the basic dataset for dynamic force spectroscopy.

In the ideal case of a single sharp energy barrier for the tip-sample interactions the dynamic force spectrum will show a linear increase of the rupture force as function of a logarithm of the loading rate, as described by a model proposed by Bell et al. Here, the slope of the rupture force spectrum is equal to the $\frac{k_BT}{x_\beta}$, where $x_\beta$ is the distance from the energy minimum to the transition state. So far, a number of theoretical models exist describing the relationship between loading rate and rupture force, based upon different assumptions and predicting distinct curve shapes.

For example, Ma X., Gosai A. et al., utilized dynamic force spectroscopy along with molecular dynamics simulations to find out the binding force between thrombin, a blood coagulation protein, and its DNA aptamer.

=== Acoustic force spectroscopy ===
A recently developed technique, acoustic force spectroscopy (AFS), allows the force manipulation of hundreds of single-molecules and single-cells in parallel, providing high experimental throughput. In this technique, a piezo element resonantly excites planar acoustic waves over a microfluidic chip. The generated acoustic waves are capable of exerting forces on microspheres with different density than the surrounding medium. Biomolecules, such as DNA, RNA or proteins, can be individually tethered between the microspheres and a surface and then probed by the acoustic forces exerted by the piezo sensor. With AFS devices it is possible to apply forces ranging from 0 to several hundreds of picoNewtons on hundreds of microspheres and obtain force-extension curves or histograms of rupture forces of many individual events in parallel.

This technique is mostly utilized to study DNA-bindings protein. For example, AFS was used to examine bacterial transcription with presence of antibacterial agents. Viral proteins also can be studied by AFS, for instance this technique was used to explore DNA compaction along with other single-molecule approaches.

Cells also can be manipulated by the acoustic forces directly, or by using microspheres as handles.

=== Optical tweezers ===
Another technique that has been gaining ground for single molecule experiments is the use of optical tweezers for applying mechanical forces on molecules. A strongly focused laser beam has the ability to catch and hold particles (of dielectric material) in a size range from nanometers to micrometers. The trapping action of optical tweezers results from the dipole or optical gradient force on the dielectric sphere. The technique of using a focused laser beam as an atom trap was first applied in 1984 at Bell laboratories. Until then experiments had been carried out using oppositely directed lasers as a means to trap particles. Later experiments, at the same project at Bell laboratories and others since, showed damage-free manipulation on cells using an infrared laser. Thus, the ground was made for biological experiments with optical trapping.

Each technique has its own advantages and disadvantages. For example, AFM cantilevers, can measure angstrom-scale, millisecond events and forces larger than 10 pN. While glass microfibers cannot achieve such fine spatial and temporal resolution, they can measure piconewton forces. Optical tweezers allow the measurement of piconewton forces and nanometer displacements which is an ideal range for many biological experiments. Magnetic tweezers can measure femtonewton forces, and additionally they can also be used to apply torsion. AFS devices allow the statistical analysis of the mechanical properties of biological systems by applying picoNewton forces to hundreds of individual particles in parallel, with sub-millisecond response time.

== Applications ==
Common applications of force spectroscopy are measurements of polymer elasticity, especially biopolymers such as RNA and DNA. Another biophysical application of polymer force spectroscopy is on protein unfolding. Modular proteins can be adsorbed to a gold or (more rarely) mica surface and then stretched. The sequential unfolding of modules is observed as a very characteristic sawtooth pattern of the force vs elongation graph; every tooth corresponds to the unfolding of a single protein module (apart from the last that is generally the detachment of the protein molecule from the tip). Much information about protein elasticity and protein unfolding can be obtained by this technique. Many proteins in the living cell must face mechanical stress.

Moreover, force spectroscopy can be used to investigate the enzymatic activity of proteins involved in DNA replication, transcription, organization and repair. This is achieved by measuring the position of a bead attached to a DNA-protein complex stalled on a DNA tether that has one end attached to a surface, while keeping the force constant. This technique has been used, for example, to study transcription elongation inhibition by Klebsidin and Acinetodin.

The other main application of force spectroscopy is the study of mechanical resistance of chemical bonds. In this case, generally the tip is functionalized with a ligand that binds to another molecule bound to the surface. The tip is pushed on the surface, allowing for contact between the two molecules, and then retracted until the newly formed bond breaks up. The force at which the bond breaks up is measured. Since mechanical breaking is a kinetic, stochastic process, the breaking force is not an absolute parameter, but it is a function of both temperature and pulling speed. Low temperatures and high pulling speeds correspond to higher breaking forces. By careful analysis of the breaking force at various pulling speeds, it is possible to map the energy landscape of the chemical bond under mechanical force. This is leading to interesting results in the study of antibody-antigen, protein-protein, protein-living cell interaction and catch bonds.

Recently this technique has been used in cell biology to measure the aggregative stochastic forces created by motor proteins that influence the motion of particles within the cytoplasm. In this way, force spectrum microscopy may be used better to understand the many cellular processes that require the motion of particles within cytoplasm.
