= Optical mount =

An optical mount is a device used to join a normal camera and another optical instrument, such as a microscope or telescope. The optical mount is generally attached to the top of the post of a camera as a lens would on one end, and fastened to the other instrument in a similar fashion. Optical mounts are used extensively in scientific imaging applications in biology and astronomy. An example of a tool with an optical mount would be optical tweezers.

Custom made optical mounts must allow the insertion and stable retention of the optical component without damage to the optical component itself.
