= Optomechanics =

Mounting and alignment of optical parts

A typical Porro prism binoculars design showing the arrangement of lenses in the optical train and the line of sight

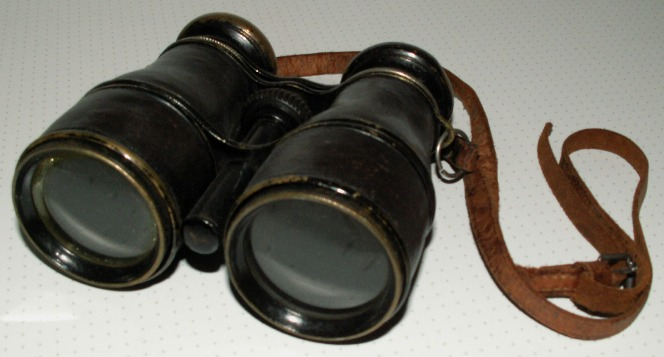
Galilean binoculars

Optomechanics is the technology for mounting optical parts and maintaining alignment of optical systems. This includes the design and manufacture of hardware used to hold and align elements, such as:

- Optical tables, breadboards, and rails
- Mirror mounts
- Optical mounts
- Translation stages
- Rotary stages
- Optical fiber aligners
- Pedestals and posts
- Micrometers, screws and screw sets

Optomechanics also covers the methods used to design and package compact and rugged optical trains, and the manufacture and maintenance of fiber optic materials
