= Kinetic scheme =

Representation of a dynamic process

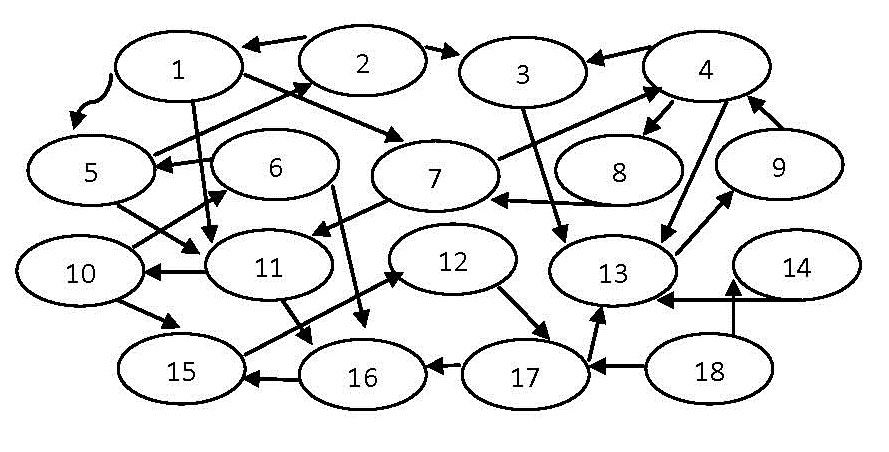
Figure 1. A kinetic scheme with 18 states

In physics, chemistry and related fields, a kinetic scheme is a network of states and connections between them representing a dynamical process. Usually a kinetic scheme represents a Markovian process, while for non-Markovian processes generalized kinetic schemes are used. Figure 1 illustrates a kinetic scheme.

== A Markovian kinetic scheme ==
=== Mathematical description ===
A kinetic scheme is a network (a directed graph) of distinct states (although repetition of states may occur and this depends on the system), where each pair of states i and j are associated with directional rates, $A_{ij}$ (and $A_{ji}$). It is described with a master equation: a first-order differential equation for the probability $\vec{P}$ of a system to occupy each one its states at time t (element i represents state i). Written in a matrix form, this states: $\frac{d\vec{P}}{dt}=\mathbf{A}\vec{P}$, where $\mathbf{A}$ is the matrix of connections (rates) $A_{ij}$.

In a Markovian kinetic scheme the connections are constant with respect to time (and any jumping time probability density function for state i is an exponential, with a rate equal the value of all the exiting connections).

When detailed balance exists in a system, the relation $A_{ji}P_{i}(t\rightarrow\infty)=A_{ij}P_{j}(t\rightarrow\infty)$ holds for every connected states i and j. The result represents the fact that any closed loop in a Markovian network in equilibrium does not have a net flow.

Matrix $\mathbf{A}$ can also represent birth and death, meaning that probability is injected (birth) or taken from (death) the system, where then, the process is not in equilibrium. These terms are different than a birth–death process, where there is simply a linear kinetic scheme.

=== Specific Markovian kinetic schemes ===
- A birth–death process is a linear one-dimensional Markovian kinetic scheme.
- Michaelis–Menten kinetics are a type of a Markovian kinetic scheme when solved with the steady state assumption for the creation of intermediates in the reaction pathway.

== Generalizations of Markovian kinetic schemes ==
- A kinetic scheme with time dependent rates: When the connections depend on the actual time (i.e. matrix $\mathbf{A}$ depends on the time, $\mathbf{A}\rightarrow\mathbf{A}(t)$ ), the process is not Markovian, and the master equation obeys, $\frac{d\vec{P}}{dt}=\mathbf{A}(t)\vec{P}$. The reason for a time dependent rates is, for example, a time dependent external field applied on a Markovian kinetic scheme (thus making the process a not Markovian one).
- A semi-Markovian kinetic scheme: When the connections represent multi exponential jumping time probability density functions, the process is semi-Markovian, and the equation of motion is an integro-differential equation termed the generalized master equation: $\frac{d\vec{P}}{dt}= \int^t_0 \mathbf{A}(t- \tau )\vec{P}( \tau )d \tau$.

An example for such a process is a reduced dimensions form.

- The Fokker Planck equation: when expanding the master equation of the kinetic scheme in a continuous space coordinate, one finds the Fokker Planck equation.

== See also ==
- Markov process
- Continuous-time Markov process
- Master equation
- Detailed balance
- Graph theory
- Semi-Markov process
- State transition system
