= Smart polymer =

Type of material

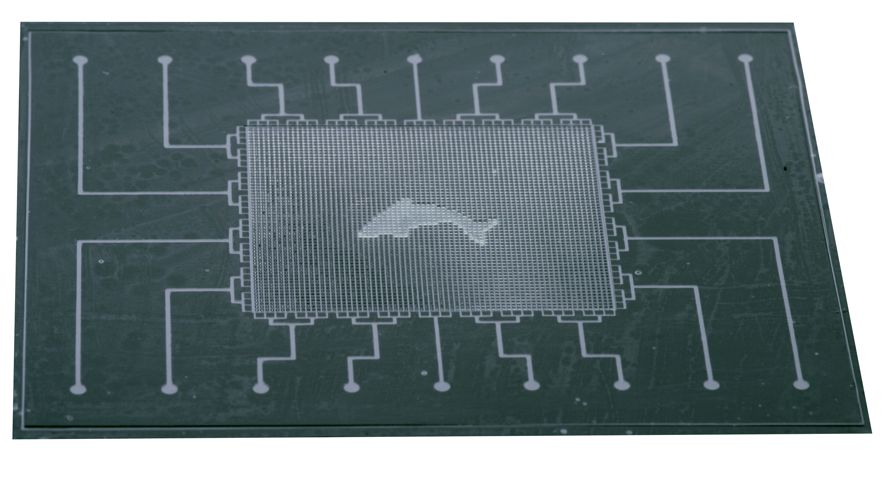
High resolution tactile display consisting of 4,320 (60x72) actuator pixels based on stimuli-responsive hydrogels. The integration density of the device is 297 components per cm². The display gives visual (monochromic) and physical (contours, relief, textures, softness) impressions of a virtual surface.

Smart polymers, stimuli-responsive polymers or functional polymers are high-performance polymers that change according to the environment they are in.

Such materials can be sensitive to a number of factors, such as temperature, humidity, pH, chemical compounds, the wavelength or intensity of light or an electrical or magnetic field and can respond in various ways, such as altering color or transparency, becoming conductive or permeable to water or changing shape (shape memory polymers). Usually, slight changes in the environment are sufficient to induce large changes in the polymer's properties.

== Stimuli ==
Several polymer systems respond to temperature, undergoing a lower critical solution temperature phase transition. One of the better-studied such polymers is poly(N-isopropylacryamide), with a transition temperature of approximately 33 °C. Several homologous N-alkyl acrylamides also show LCST behavior, with the transition temperature depending on the length of the hydrophobic side chain. Above their transition temperature, these polymers become insoluble in water. This behavior is believed to be entropy driven.

== Classification and chemistry ==
Linear and matrix smart polymers exist with a variety of properties depending on reactive functional groups and side chains. These groups might be responsive to pH, temperature, ionic strength, electric or magnetic fields, and light. Some polymers are reversibly cross-linked by noncovalent bonds that can break and reform depending on external conditions. Nanotechnology has been fundamental in the development of certain nanoparticle polymers such as dendrimers and fullerenes, that have been applied for drug delivery. Traditional drug encapsulation has been done using lactic acid polymers. More recent developments have seen the formation of lattice-like matrices that hold the drug of interest integrated or entrapped between the polymer strands.

A graft-and-block copolymer is two different polymers grafted together. A number of patents already exist for various combinations of polymers with different reactive groups. The product exhibits properties of both individual components which adds a new dimension to an intelligent polymer structure and may be useful for certain applications. Cross-linking hydrophobic and hydrophilic polymers result in the formation of micelle-like structures that can protectively assist drug delivery through aqueous medium until conditions at the target location cause the simultaneous breakdown of both polymers.

A graft-and-block approach might be useful for solving problems encountered by the use of a common bioadhesive polymer, polyacrylic acid (PAA). PAA adheres to mucosal surfaces but will swell and degrade rapidly at pH 7.4, resulting in the rapid release of drugs entrapped in its matrix. A combination of PAAc with another polymer that is less sensitive to changes at neutral pH might increase the residence time and slow the release of the drug, thus improving bioavailability and effectiveness.

Hydrogels are polymer networks that do not dissolve in water but swell or collapse in changing aqueous environments. They are useful in biotechnology for phase separation because they are reusable or recyclable. New ways to control the flow, or catch and release of target compounds, in hydrogels, are being investigated. Highly specialized hydrogels have been developed to deliver and release drugs into specific tissues. Hydrogels made from PAAc are especially common because of their bioadhesive properties and tremendous absorbency.

Enzyme immobilization in hydrogels is a fairly well-established process. Reversibly cross-linked polymer networks and hydrogels can be similarly applied to a biological system where the response and release of a drug are triggered by the target molecule itself. Alternatively, the response might be turned on or off by the product of an enzyme reaction. This is often done by incorporating an enzyme, receptor or antibody, that binds to the molecule of interest, into the hydrogel. Once bound, a chemical reaction takes place that triggers a reaction from the hydrogel. The trigger can be oxygen, sensed using oxidoreductase enzymes or a pH-sensing response. An example of the latter is the combined entrapment of glucose oxidase and insulin in a pH-responsive hydrogel. In the presence of glucose, the formation of gluconic acid by the enzyme triggers the release of insulin from the hydrogel.

Two criteria for this technology to work effectively are enzyme stability and rapid kinetics (quick response to the trigger and recovery after removal of the trigger). Several strategies have been tested in type 1 diabetes research, involving the use of similar types of smart polymers that can detect changes in blood glucose levels and trigger the production or release of insulin. Likewise, there are many possible applications of similar hydrogels as drug delivery agents for other conditions and diseases.

Pyromellitamide gels are types of gels based on pyromellitamide molecules. Such gels being developed which will enable the repair of severed muscles and spinal cords in patients.

== Applications ==
Smart polymers appear in highly specialized applications and everyday products alike. They are used for sensors and actuators such as artificial muscles, the production of hydrogels, biodegradable packaging, and to a great extent in biomedical engineering . One example is a polymer that undergoes conformational change in response to pH change, which can be used in drug delivery. Another is a humidity-sensitive polymer used in self-adaptive wound dressings that automatically regulate moisture balance in and around the wound.

The nonlinear response of smart polymers is what makes them so unique and effective. A significant change in structure and properties can be induced by a very small stimulus. Once that change occurs, there is no further change, meaning a predictable all-or-nothing response occurs, with complete uniformity throughout the polymer. Smart polymers may change conformation, adhesiveness or water retention properties, due to slight changes in pH, ionic strength, temperature, ultrasound, or other triggers. For example, Kubota et al designed and loaded ultrasound-responsive hydrogel microbeads with silica nanoparticles that were released under ultrasonic stimulation.

Another factor in the effectiveness of smart polymers lies in the inherent nature of polymers in general. The strength of each molecule's response to changes in stimuli is the composite of changes of individual monomer units which, alone, would be weak. However, these weak responses, compounded hundreds or thousands of times, create a considerable force for driving biological processes.

The pharmacy industry has been directly related to the polymer's advances. In this field, polymers are playing a significant role, and their advances are helping entire populations around the world. The human body is a machine with a complex system and works as a response to chemical signals. Polymers play the role of drug delivery technology that can control the release of therapeutic agents in periodic doses. Polymers are capable of molecular recognition and directing intracellular delivery. Smart polymers get into the field to play and take advantage of molecular recognition and finally produced awareness systems and polymer carriers to facilitate drug delivery in the body system.

Amplifying fluorescent polymer (AFP), a type of smart polymer, is used to detect explosives such as TNT, as well as PFAS and illicit Materials.

=== Biomedicine ===
Currently, the most prevalent use for smart polymers in biomedicine is for specifically targeted drug delivery. Since the advent of timed-release pharmaceuticals, scientists have been faced with the problem of finding ways to deliver drugs to a particular site in the body without having them first degrade in the highly acidic stomach environment. Prevention of adverse effects on healthy bone and tissue is also an important consideration. Researchers have devised ways to use smart polymers to control the release of drugs until the delivery system has reached the desired target. This release is controlled by either a chemical or physiological trigger.

Smart polymer matrices release drugs by a chemical or physiological structure-altering reaction, often a hydrolysis reaction resulting in cleavage of bonds and release of drug as the matrix breaks down into biodegradable components. The use of natural polymers has given way to artificially synthesized polymers such as polyanhydrides, polyesters, polyacrylic acids, poly(methyl methacrylates), poly(phthalaldehyde), and polyurethanes. Hydrophilic, amorphous, low-molecular-weight polymers containing heteroatoms (i.e., atoms other than carbon) have been found to degrade fastest. Scientists control the rate of drug delivery by varying these properties thus adjusting the rate of degradation.

=== Other ===
Smart polymers are not just for drug delivery. Their properties make them especially suited for bioseparations. The time and costs involved in purifying proteins might be reduced significantly by using smart polymers that undergo rapid reversible changes in response to a change in medium properties. Conjugated systems have been used for many years in physical and affinity separations and immunoassays. Microscopic changes in the polymer structure are manifested as precipitate formation, which may be used to aid the separation of trapped proteins from solution.

These systems work when a protein or other molecule that is to be separated from a mix, forms a bioconjugate with the polymer and precipitates with the polymer when its environment undergoes a change. The precipitate is removed from the media, thus separating the desired component of the conjugate from the rest of the mixture. Removal of this component from the conjugate depends on the recovery of the polymer and a return to its original state, thus hydrogels are very useful for such processes.

Another approach to controlling biological reactions using smart polymers is to prepare recombinant proteins with built-in polymer binding sites close to ligand or cell binding sites. This technique has been used to control ligand and cell binding activity, based on a variety of triggers including temperature and light.

Smart polymers play an essential part in the technology of self-adaptive wound dressings. The dressing design presents proprietary super-absorbent synthetic smart polymers immobilized in the 3-dimensional fiber matrix with added hydration functionality achieved by embedding hydrogel into the core of the material.

The dressing's mode of action relies on the ability of the polymers to sense and adapt to the changing humidity and fluid content in all areas of the wound simultaneously and to automatically and reversibly switch from absorption to hydration. The smart polymer action ensures the active synchronized response of the dressing material to changes in and around the wound to support the optimal moist healing environment at all times.

== Future ==
It has been suggested that polymers might be developed that can learn and self-correct behavior over time. Although this might be a far-distant possibility, there are other more feasible applications that appear to be coming in the near future. One of these is the idea of smart toilets that analyze urine and help identify health problems. In environmental biotechnology, smart irrigation systems have been also proposed. It would be incredibly useful to have a system that turns on and off, and controls fertilizer concentrations, based on soil moisture, pH, and nutrient levels. Many creative approaches to targeted drug delivery systems that self-regulate based on their unique cellular surroundings, are also under investigation.

There are obvious possible problems associated with the use of smart polymers in biomedicine. The most worrisome is the possibility of toxicity or incompatibility of artificial substances in the body, including degradation products and byproducts. However, smart polymers have enormous potential in biotechnology and biomedical applications if these obstacles can be overcome.

== See also ==
- Programmable matter
- Smart material
- Covalent adaptable networks / vitrimers
