= Mohsen Shahinpoor =

Iranian-American scientist

- Born: September 14, 1943; Iran
- Education: Abadan Institute of Technology (Note: Now known as the Petroleum University of Technology.)
- Known for: Exploring the applications of smart materials in mechanical and biomedical engineering
- Awards: "Eminent Engineer" title, U.S. National Engineering Honor Society; Engineer of the Year 1992, US Society of Professional Engineers; Space Act Award for Development of A Space Dust Wiper Made With Polymeric Artificial Muscles, NASA; Elected Fellow, Royal Society of Chemistry; Elected Fellow, US National Academy of Inventors
- Scientific career
- Fields: Mechanical engineering; Biomedical engineering
- Workplaces: Shiraz University; Clarkson University; University of New Mexico; Environmental Robots Incorporated; University of Maine
- Thesis: Free and Forced Large Amplitude Oscillations of Homogeneous and Nonhomogeneous Polymeric Hyperelastic Bodies (1970)
- Website: http://mohsenshahinpoor.org/

Mohsen (MO) Shahinpoor (born 1943) is an Iranian American engineer and researcher, best known for his research into the potential applications of smart materials in biomedical engineering. He is professor emeritus of the mechanical engineering department at the University of Maine, which he chaired from 2007 to 2014. He is also a professor at the university's Graduate School of Biomedical Science and Engineering.

Shahinpoor's research has mainly focused on electroactive polymers, with a particular focus on ionic polymer-metal composites (IPMCs). He has investigated how these materials could be used as for a wide variety of applications, such as components of biomimetic soft robotics, robotic surgery, soft actuators, self-powered energy harvesters, and sensors.

Shahinpoor is the author of over 93 books. These include Intelligent Robotic Systems: Modeling & Simulation, Intelligent Materials, Artificial Muscles: Applications of Advanced Polymeric Nano Composites, and High-Pressure Shock Compression of Solids. His book entitled Fundamentals of Smart Materials is the first textbook on fundamentals of smart materials with a solutions manual. He has also published over 600 other publications, and is co-editor of a smart materials series published by the Royal Society of Chemistry.

Shahinpoor is a fellow of the American Society of Mechanical Engineers, the Institute of Physics, the National Academy of Inventors, the Royal Society of Chemistry, and the International Association of Advanced Materials.

Shahinpoor is a topic editor-in-chief of Bioinspired Robotics, International Journal of Advanced Robotic Systems, and a founding editor and editor-in-chief of International Journal of Environmentally Intelligent Design and Manufacturing. His work has been featured multiple times in media articles.

== Education ==
Shahinpoor completed his initial education in Iran, receiving his bachelor's of science in chemical, materials and petroleum engineering in 1966 from the Abadan Institute of Technology (Note: Now known as the Petroleum University of Technology.). He then moved to the United States and received his M.Sc. in mechanical and aerospace engineering from the University of Delaware in 1968; two years later, the school awarded him a PhD in both subjects. From 1971 to 1972, he was a postdoctoral research fellow at Johns Hopkins University.

== Career ==
Following his doctoral studies, Shahinpoor moved back to Iran to accept the position of assistant professor of mechanical engineering at Shiraz University. He was promoted to associate professor in 1972, to full professor in 1976, and to the chair of the Department of Mechanical Engineering shortly thereafter. He remained in this post until 1979, when he moved back to the US. He quickly found employment as a professor of mechanical and industrial engineering at Clarkson University. He stayed at Clarkson for five years, during which time he was appointed co-director of the school's the Robotics & Manufacturing Center.

In 1984, Shahinpoor left Clarkson to join the University of New Mexico (UNM) as its Regents Professor of Mechanical Engineering. During his tenure at UNM, he was appointed director of the school's CAD/CAM, CIM, & Robotics Laboratories; he was also twice appointed to the position of Halliburton Endowed Chair Professor of CAD/CAM, CIM & Robotics. He also directed the school's Intelligent Materials, Structures and Systems Laboratory; the Spine Biomechatronics Laboratory; and the Artificial Muscle Research Institute. Shahinpoor was eventually appointed chair of UNM's Mechanical Engineering Department, a position he served in for seven years. In 1993, he became an associate dean of engineering, a role he remained in until 1995.

During his time at UNM, Shahinpoor received a secondary appointment as a professor of surgery and biomedical engineering at the UNM School of Medicine. In 2002, he was promoted to research professor of surgery. That same year, he was made chief scientist and director of biomedical products at Environmental Robots Incorporated.

Shahinpoor departed UNM in 2007 to join the University of Maine (UMaine) as a professor of biomedical science and engineering. He held the post of Richard C. Hill Professor until 2014, when he moved to the school's mechanical engineering department. While at UMaine, Shahinpoor served as the director of the Advanced Robotics Laboratory; the Smart Materials, Artificial Muscles and Tissue Manufacturing Laboratory; and the Biomedical Engineering and Robotic Surgery Laboratory.

== Research ==
Shahinpoor has worked on ionic polymer–metal composites (IPMCs), biomimetic soft artificial muscles, biomimetics and artificial muscles, mechatronics, electroactive polymers, nano-bio engineering, intelligent robotic systems, robotic surgery, health engineering, heart assist systems, bionic vision and ophthalmological engineering as well as neuro and endovascular surgical tools and medical implants.

On the materials side, he and his students have invented the ionic polymeric, artificial muscles (IPMCs) as actuator, energy harvester and sensor, and robotic artificial muscles, wrote the first book on artificial muscles, and made smart materials contributions. His publication Biomimetic Robotic Venus Flytrap has received recognition by numerous journals and media channels. He also wrote the first textbook on robotics by a mechanical engineering professor and has contributed to soft biomimetic robots.

=== Ionic polymer-metal composites as biomimetic sensors, actuators and artificial muscles ===
Shahinpoor has conducted extensive research on ionic polymeric-metal composites (IPMCs) and in a paper published in 1995, he explained the micro-electro-mechanics of ionic polymeric gels as electrically controllable artificial muscles. He introduced the mathematical modeling relating to IPMCs and identified the key parameters based on the vibrational and resonance characteristics of sensors and actuators made with IPMCs. He presented the successful working of artificial muscles in harsh cryogenic environments. Shahinpoor, along with Kwang J. Kim, published a paper in 2000s and presented a fabrication method for adjusting the scale of IPMC artificial muscles in a strip size of micro-to-centimeter thickness.

In the 2000s, Shahinpoor authored review papers on IPMCs and discussed the manufacturing techniques, phenomenological laws and mechanical characteristics of the composites along with the methodologies in developing high-force-density IPMCs. He also presented various modeling and simulation techniques, along with industrial and biomedical applications of IPMCs.

=== Advanced nanocomposites and electroactive polymers ===
Shahinpoor worked with NASA in a study to reduce the mass, size, the instrumentation cost and the power consumed in its future missions. He studied two groups of electroactive polymer (EAP) materials such as bending ionomers and longitudinal electrostatically driven elastomers, which can be used as an alternative to current actuators. He conducted an analysis of the electrical characteristics of the ionomer EAP, discussed its major limitations, and developed an EAP driven miniature robotic arm which was controlled by a MATLAB code for the lifting and dropping of the arm, and for the opening and closing of EAP fingers of a 4-finger gripper.

Shahinpoor authored a paper in the late 1990s on the development of effective EAP driven mechanisms, which emulate human hands such as a gripper, manipulator arm and a surface wiper; and also highlighted the need for greater actuation force capability.

=== Neuro and endovascular surgical tools and medical implants ===
Shahinpoor's research has also focused on neurological and endovascular surgical tools and medical implants. He has registered several patents relating to surgical tools and medical implants which include spinal implants, implantable pump apparatuses and self-powered micro-pump assembly. He developed zonular mini-bridge implants made of polymeric gels, silicone polymers or a composite, for the surgical correction of presbyopia and hyperopia.

== Awards and honors ==
- 1977 - Engineering Researcher of the Year 1977 Award, selected jointly by the Academy of Sciences of Iran and Ministry of Science and Higher Education of Iran, awarded by Her Majesty the Queen Farah of Iran
- 1983 - Awarded "Eminent Engineer" title, U.S. National Engineering Honor Society
- 1986 - Award of Achievement for the creation of the world's first multi-station Robotics Instructional Laboratory at UNM, U.S. Society of Technical Communications
- 1986 - Faculty Achievement Award for Excellence in Teaching and Research, University of New Mexico's Burlington Northern Foundation
- 1988 - Halliburton Endowed Chair Professorship in CAD/CAM, CIM & Robotics, School of Engineering, University of New Mexico
- 1989 - Elected Fellow of ASME, American Society of Mechanical Engineers
- 1991 - Award for Excellence in Manufacturing Engineering Education, Society of Manufacturing Engineers
- 1992 - Awarded the title of "Engineer of the Year 1992", US Society of Professional Engineers
- 1993, 1994 - Award for Excellence in Research, Sandia National Laboratories
- 1996 - Faculty Achievement Award, University of New Mexico Libraries
- 2001 - Elected Fellow, Institute of Physics, UK
- 2003 - Space Act Award for "Development of A Space Dust Wiper Made With Polymeric Artificial Muscles", NASA
- 2008 - Distinguished Member of the Francis Crowe Society with Medallion, University of Maine
- 2015 - Elected Fellow, Royal Society of Chemistry
- 2015 - Elected Fellow, US National Academy of Inventors
- 2020 - Elected Fellow, International Association for Advanced Materials

== Bibliography ==
=== Selected books ===
- High-Pressure Shock Compression of Solids (1993) ISBN 978-0387979649
- Intelligent Robotic Systems: Modeling & Simulation (1994) ISBN 978-1884077005
- Energy, Matter, Intelligence and Life (EMIL); The Evolution of EMIL (2000) ISBN 978-1884077067
- Artificial Muscles: Applications of Advanced Polymeric Nano Composites (2007) ISBN 978-1584887133
- Robotic Surgery: Smart Materials, Robotic Structures and Artificial Muscles (2014) ISBN 978-9814316231
- Ionic Polymer Metal Composites (IPMCs): Smart Multi-Functional Materials and Artificial Muscles, Volume 2 (2015) ISBN 978-1782627210
- Fundamentals of Smart Materials (2020) ISBN 978-1782626459
- Artificial Muscles: Applications of Advanced Polymeric Nano Composites CRC Press, Second Edition' (2022) ISBN 978-0-367-85790-5

=== Selected articles ===
- Shahinpoor, M., & Kim, K. J. (2001). "Ionic polymer-metal composites: I. Fundamentals". Smart Materials and Structures, 10(4), 819.
- Shahinpoor, M., Bar-Cohen, Y., Simpson, J. O., & Smith, J. (1998). "Ionic polymer-metal composites (IPMCs) as biomimetic sensors, actuators and artificial muscles-a review". Smart Materials and Structures, 7(6), R15.
- Shahinpoor, M., & Kim, K. J. (2004). "Ionic polymer–metal composites: IV. Industrial and medical applications". Smart Materials and Structures, 14(1), 197.
- Kim, K. J., & Shahinpoor, M. (2003). "Ionic polymer–metal composites: II. Manufacturing techniques". Smart Materials and Structures, 12(1), 65.
- Shahinpoor, M., & Kim, K. J. (2004). "Ionic polymer–metal composites: III. Modeling and simulation as biomimetic sensors, actuators, transducers, and artificial muscles". Smart Materials and Structures, 13(6), 1362.

== Personal life ==
Shahinpoor is a chess player.
