= IPMC =

IPMC may refer to:

- Ionic polymer-metal composite or compound
- Intellectual Property Management Corporation (IPMC), a non-profit successor to the IETF Trust
- Intelligent platform management controller, in Advanced Telecommunications Computing Architecture
- IPMI Management Controller, in Hardware Platform Interface
- IP Multicast
- International Postgraduate Medical College
- International Property Maintenance Code
