= Cetemmsa =

Research center based in Barcelona, Spain

- Headquarters: Mataró, Spain
- Website: www.cetemmsa.com

Cetemmsa is a research center in Spain for smart materials. It is based in Barcelona.

Cetemmsa focuses on applying smart materials to the following markets: health and wellbeing, transport and mobility infrastructure, security and protection, professional sport, architecture and construction, and technical textiles.

Recent Cetemmsa projects include the integration of sensors into vehicles using smart fabrics, and the use of smart materials to improve the comfort and environment of train interiors.
