= Pyromellitamide gels =

Gels used to repair severed muscles and spinal cords in patients

Pyrometallide gels are types of gels based on pyromellitamide molecules. Such gels being developed which will enable the repair of severed muscles and spinal cords in patients.

== Artificial muscles ==
These types of artificial muscles are made possible by creating synthetic materials which are very similar to the ones which make up human tissues and cells. These artificial materials are so similar that the body does not reject the material and instead allows normal cell growth in the materials which eventually become absorbed into the body.

=== Self-assembled gel ===
The gel molecule is composed of a tetra-alkane benzene-1,2,4,5-tetracarboxamide. The gel structure is made up of millions of tiny fibres, which form a 3D mesh by trapping a liquid in the same way that a sponge absorbs water, to form a solid. The unique feature of self-assembled gels is that chemical reactions are not required to form the fibres; it is simply a case of heating them up in a liquid and waiting for them to set.

=== Uses ===
There is huge range of potential applications for these gels. Aside from the artificial muscles, these gels could also be used for drug delivery in cancer patients, where they can injected into the patient, and the gel will slowly release a constant stream of anti-cancer drugs in the body. There are also applications for computer and television screens, where gels are used for LCD screens. These gels could lower the manufacturing costs and be used to construct flexible display screens.

== See also ==
- Smart polymer
- Artificial muscles
