= Dielectric elastomers =

Smart material systems

Working principle of dielectric elastomer actuators. An elastomeric film is coated on both sides with electrodes. The electrodes are connected to a circuit. By applying a voltage $U$ the electrostatic pressure $p_{el}$ acts. Due to the mechanical compression the elastomer film contracts in the thickness direction and expands in the film plane directions. The elastomer film moves back to its original position when it is short-circuited.

Dielectric elastomers (DEs) are smart material systems that produce large strains and are promising for Soft robotics, Artificial muscle, etc. They belong to the group of electroactive polymers (EAP). DE actuators (DEA) transform electric energy into mechanical work and vice versa. Thus, they can be used as both actuators, sensors, and energy-harvesting devices. They have high elastic energy density and fast response due to being lightweight, highly stretchable, and operating under the electrostatic principle. They have been investigated since the late 1990s. Many prototype applications exist. Every year, conferences are held in the Canada and Europe.

== Working principles ==
A DEA is a compliant capacitor (see image), where a passive elastomer film is sandwiched between two compliant electrodes. When a voltage $U$ is applied, the electrostatic pressure $p_{el}$ arising from the Coulomb forces acts between the electrodes. The electrostatic pressure force $p_{el}$ acting on the plane-parallel plates of a capacitor is given as:

$p_{el} = \frac {1}{2}\varepsilon _{0}\varepsilon _{r}{U^{2} \over z^{2}}$

where $\varepsilon_0$ is the vacuum permittivity, $\varepsilon_r$ is the dielectric constant of the polymer and $z$ is the thickness of the elastomer film in the current state (during deformation). The pressure therefore depends on the square of the electric field strength and can be significantly increased by using dielectric breakdown-resistant materials with a high relative permittivity $\varepsilon_r$. In addition, there is electrostatic repulsion between like charges within the electrodes. As a result, the equivalent electromechanical pressure $p_{eq}$is twice as large as the electrostatic pressure $p_{el}$ and is given by:

$p_{eq}=\varepsilon_0\varepsilon_r\frac{U^2}{z^2}$

Usually, strains of DEA are in the order of 10–35%, maximum values reach 300% (the acrylic elastomer VHB 4910, commercially available from 3M, which also supports a high elastic energy density and a high electrical breakdown strength).

=== Ionic ===
Replacing the electrodes with soft hydrogels allows ionic transport to replace electron transport. Aqueous ionic hydrogels can deliver potentials of multiple kilovolts, despite the onset of electrolysis at below 1.5 V.

The difference between the capacitance of the double layer and the dielectric leads to a potential across the dielectric that can be millions of times greater than that across the double layer. Potentials in the kilovolt range can be realized without electrochemically degrading the hydrogel.

Deformations are well controlled, reversible, and capable of high-frequency operation. The resulting devices can be perfectly transparent. High-frequency actuation is possible. Switching speeds are limited only by mechanical inertia. The hydrogel's stiffness can be thousands of times smaller than the dielectric's, allowing actuation without mechanical constraint across a range of nearly 100% at millisecond speeds. They can be biocompatible.

Remaining issues include drying of the hydrogels, ionic build-up, hysteresis, and electrical shorting.

Early experiments in semiconductor device research relied on ionic conductors to investigate field modulation of contact potentials in silicon and to enable the first solid-state amplifiers. Work since 2000 has established the utility of electrolyte gate electrodes. Ionic gels can also serve as elements of high-performance, stretchable graphene transistors.

== Materials ==
Films of carbon powder or grease loaded with carbon black were early choices as electrodes for the DEAs. Such materials have poor reliability and are not available with established manufacturing techniques. Improved characteristics can be achieved with liquid metal, sheets of graphene, coatings of carbon nanotubes, surface-implanted layers of metallic nanoclusters and corrugated or patterned metal films.

These options offer limited mechanical properties, sheet resistances, switching times and easy integration. Silicones and acrylic elastomers are other alternatives.

The requirements for an elastomer material are:

- The material should have low stiffness (especially when large strains are required);
- The dielectric constant should be high;
- The electrical breakdown strength should be high.

Mechanically prestretching the elastomer film offers the possibility of enhancing the electrical breakdown strength. Further reasons for prestretching include:

- Film thickness decreases, requiring a lower voltage to obtain the same electrostatic pressure;
- Avoiding compressive stresses in the film plane directions.

The elastomers show a visco-hyperelastic behavior. Models that describe large strains and viscoelasticity are required for the calculation of such actuators.

Materials used in research include graphite powder, silicone oil / graphite mixtures, gold electrodes. The electrode should be conductive and compliant. Compliance is important so that the elastomer is not constrained mechanically when elongated.

Films of polyacrylamide hydrogels formed with salt water can be laminated onto the dielectric surfaces, replacing electrodes.

DEs based on silicone (PDMS) and natural rubber are promising research fields. Properties such as fast response times and efficiency are superior using natural rubber based DEs compared to VHB (acrylic elastomer) based DEs for strains under 15%.

== Instabilities in Dielectric elastomers ==
Dielectric elastomer actuators are to be designed so as to avoid the phenomenon of dielectric breakdown in their whole course of motion. In addition to the dielectric breakdown, DEAs are susceptible to another failure mode, referred to as the electromechanical instability, which arises due to nonlinear interaction between the electrostatic and the mechanical restoring forces. In several cases, the electromechanical instability precedes the dielectric breakdown. The instability parameters (critical voltage and the corresponding maximum stretch) are dependent on several factors, such as the level of prestretch, temperature, and the deformation dependent permittivity. Additionally, they also depend on the voltage waveform used to drive the actuator.

== Configurations ==
Configurations include:

- Framed/In-Plane actuators: A framed or in-plane actuator is an elastomeric film coated/printed with two electrodes. Typically a frame or support structure is mounted around the film. Examples are expanding circles and planars (single and multiple phase.)
- Cylindrical/Roll actuators: Coated elastomer films are rolled around an axis. By activation, a force and an elongation appear in the axial direction. The actuators can be rolled around a compression spring or without a core. Applications include artificial muscles (prosthetics), mini- and microrobots, and valves.
- Diaphragm actuators: A diaphragm actuator is made as a planar construction which is then biased in the z-axis to produce out of plane motion.
- Shell-like actuators: Planar elastomer films are coated at specific locations in the form of electrode segments. With a well-directed activation, the foils assume complex three-dimensional shapes. Examples may be utilized for propelling vehicles through air or water, e.g. for blimps.
- Stack actuators: Stacking planar actuators can increase deformation. Actuators that shorten under activation are good candidates.
- Thickness Mode Actuators: The force and stroke moves in the z-direction (out of plane). Thickness mode actuators are a typically a flat film that may stack layers to increase displacement.
- Bending actuators:The in-plane actuation of dielectric elastomer (DE) based actuator is converted into out-of-plane actuation such as bending or folding using unimorph configuration where one or multiple layers of DE sheets are stacked on top of one layer of inactive substrate.
- Balloon actuators: Plane elastomer is attached to an air chamber and inflated with a constant volume of air, then the stiffness of the elastomer can be varied by applying electrical load; hence resulting in voltage-controlled bulging of the elastomeric balloon.

== Applications ==
Dielectric elastomers offer multiple potential applications with the potential to replace many electromagnetic actuators, pneumatics and piezo actuators. A list of potential applications include:

- Haptic Feedback
- Pumps
- Valves
- Robotics
- Active origami-inspired structure
- Prosthetics
- Power Generation
- Active Vibration Control of Structures
- Optical Positioners such for auto-focus, zoom, image stabilization
- Sensing of force and pressure
- Active Braille Displays
- Speakers
- Deformable surfaces for optics and aerospace
- Energy Harvesting
- Noise-canceling windows
- Display-mounted tactile interfaces
- Adaptive optics
