= Thermally induced shape-memory effect (polymers) =

Effect in material science

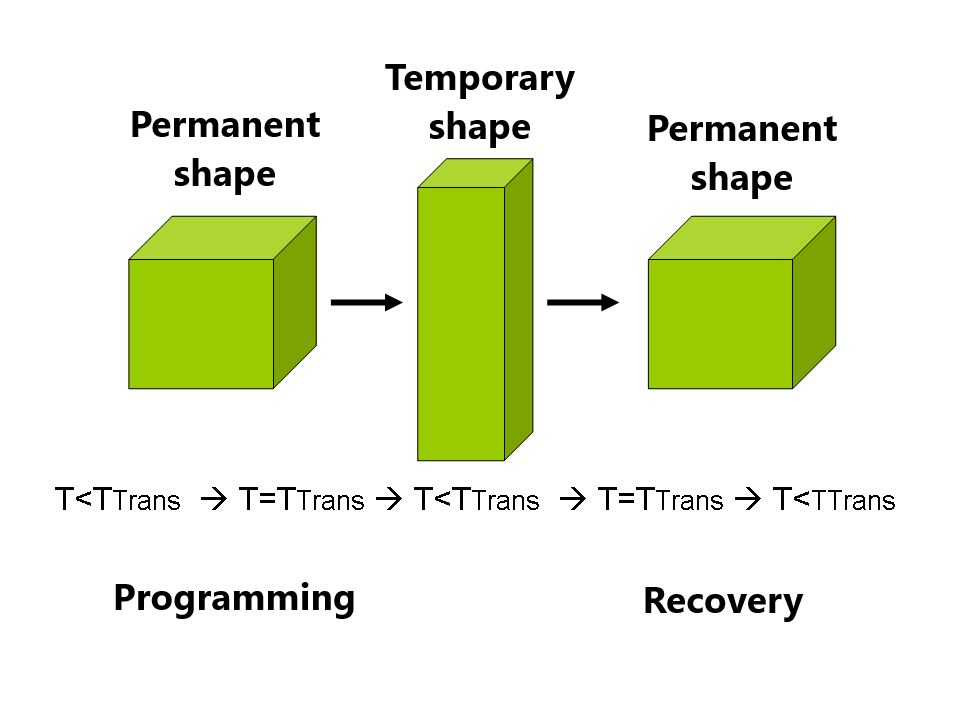
General diagram of the thermally induced shape-memory effect in polymers.

The thermally induced unidirectional shape-shape-memory effect is an effect classified within the new so-called smart materials. Polymers with thermally induced shape-memory effect are new materials, whose applications are recently being studied in different fields of science (e.g., medicine), communications and entertainment.

There are currently reported and commercially used systems. However, the possibility of programming other polymers is present, due to the number of copolymers that can be designed: the possibilities are almost endless.

== General information ==
Polymers with thermally induced shape-memory effect are those polymers that respond to external stimuli and because of this have the ability to change their shape. The thermally induced shape-memory effect results from a combination of proper processing and programming of the system.

This effect can be observed in polymers with very different chemical composition, which opens a great possibility of applications.

=== Description of the effect on polymers ===
In the first step the polymers are processed by means of common techniques, such as injection or extrusion, thermoforming, at a temperature (T_{High}) at which the polymer melts, obtaining a final shape which is called "permanent" shape.

The next step is called system programming and involves heating the sample to a transition temperature (T_{Trans}). At that temperature the polymer is deformed, reaching a shape called "temporary". Immediately afterwards the temperature of the sample is lowered.

The final step of the effect involves the recovery of the permanent shape. The sample is heated to the transition temperature (T_{Trans}) and within a short time the recovery of the permanent shape is observed.

This effect is not a natural property of the polymer, but results from proper programming of the system with the appropriate chemistry.

For a polymer to exhibit this effect, it must have two components at the molecular level: bonds (chemical or physical) to determine the permanent shape and "trigger" segments with a T_{Trans} to fix the temporary shape.

==== Characteristics of the effect on polymers ====
- Metals exhibit a bidirectional shape-memory effect, maintaining one shape at each temperature. Polymers recover their shape only once.
- Polymers can change their shape with elongations up to 200% while metals have a maximum of 8-10% elongation.
- Recovery in metals and ceramics involves a change in crystal structure, while recovery in polymers is due to the action of entropic forces and anchor points.
- Polymers can be designed according to the desired application, they can be: biodegradable, drug delivery systems (medicinal), antibacterial, etc.
- The transition temperature is designed with "trigger" segments, which makes temperature adjustment easier than in ceramics, since they depend on equiatomic quantities.

==== Functioning ====
It should first be noted that the first inelastic mechanism of these polymers is the mobility of the chains and the conformational rearrangement of the groups. Then the effect on semi-crystalline and amorphous polymers must be distinguished. In both cases, anchor points must be created that act as "triggers" for the effect. In the case of amorphous polymers, these will be the knots or "tangles" of the chains, and in the case of semi-crystalline polymers, the crystals themselves will form these anchor points.

By modifying the shape of the material under minimal critical stress, the chains slide and a metastable structure is created, which increases the organization and order of the chains (lower entropy), when the deformation load is eliminated, the anchor points provide a storage mechanism for macroscopic stresses in the form of small localized stresses and decreasing entropy.

In the glassy state the rotational motions of the molecules are frozen and impeded, as the temperature increases and the glassy state is reached, these motions thaw and rotations and relaxations occur, the molecules take the form that is entropically most favorable to them, the one with the lowest energy. These movements are called relaxation process and the formation of "random strings" to eliminate stresses is called shape-memory loss.

A polymer will exhibit the shape-memory effect if it is susceptible to being stabilized in a given state of deformation, preventing the molecules from slipping and regaining their higher entropy (lower energy) form. This can be achieved almost entirely by creating crosslinking or vulcanization, these new bonds act as anchors and prevent the relaxation of the chains, the anchor points can be physical or chemical.

==== Comparison with metals and ceramics ====
The unidirectional shape-shape-memory effect was first observed by Chand and Read in 1951 in a Gold-Cadmium alloy and in 1963 Buehler described this effect for nitinol, which is an equiatomic Nickel-Titanium alloy.

This effect in metals and ceramics is based on a change in the crystal structure, called martensitic phase transition. The disadvantage of these materials is that it is an equiatomic alloy and deviations of 1% in the composition modify the transition temperature by approximately 100 K.

Some metals and ceramics present the effect bidirectionally, which means that at a certain temperature there is a shape and this can be changed by changing the temperature, but if the first temperature is recovered, also the first shape is recovered. This is achieved by training the material for each shape at each temperature.

Metals and ceramics with thermally induced bidirectional shape-memory effect have had great application in medical implants, sensors, transducers, etc. Many present a risk however due to their high toxicity.

=== Phases in the system ===
To obtain the effect, it is necessary to achieve a phase separation, one of these phases works as the trigger for the temporary form, using a transition temperature that can be Tm or Tg and in this effect is called T_{Trans}. A second phase has the higher transition temperature and above this temperature the polymer melts and is processed by conventional methods.

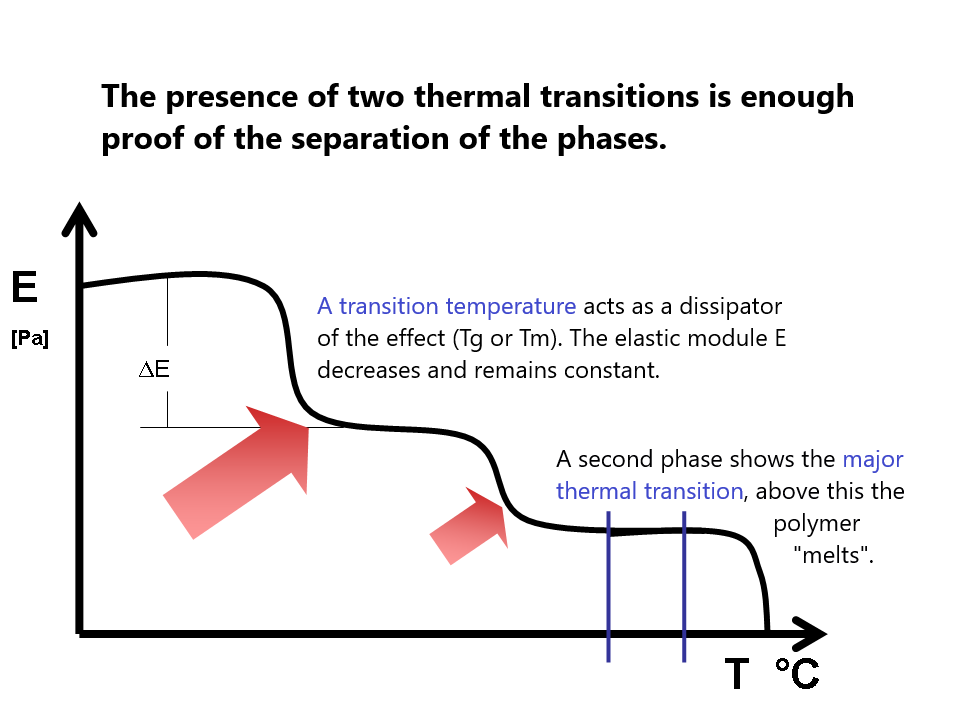

The ratio of the elements forming the phase separation largely regulates the T_{Trans} transition temperature; this is much easier to control than in metallic alloys.

An example of this is the poly(ethylene oxide-ethylene terephthalate) or EOET copolymer. The polyethylene terephthalate (PET) segment has a relatively high Tg and its Tm is commonly referred to as the "hard" segment, whereas polyethylene ethylene oxide (PEO), has a relatively low Tm and Tg and is referred to as the "soft" segment. In the final polymer these segments separate into two phases in the solid state. PET has a high degree of crystallinity and the formation of these crystals provides for the flow and rearrangement of the PEO chains as they are stretched at temperatures higher than their Tm.

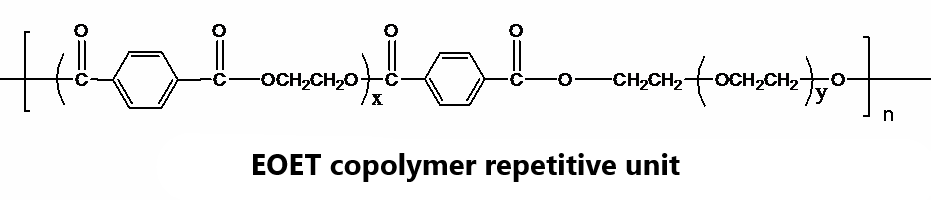

== Experimentation ==
=== Achieving of the effect ===
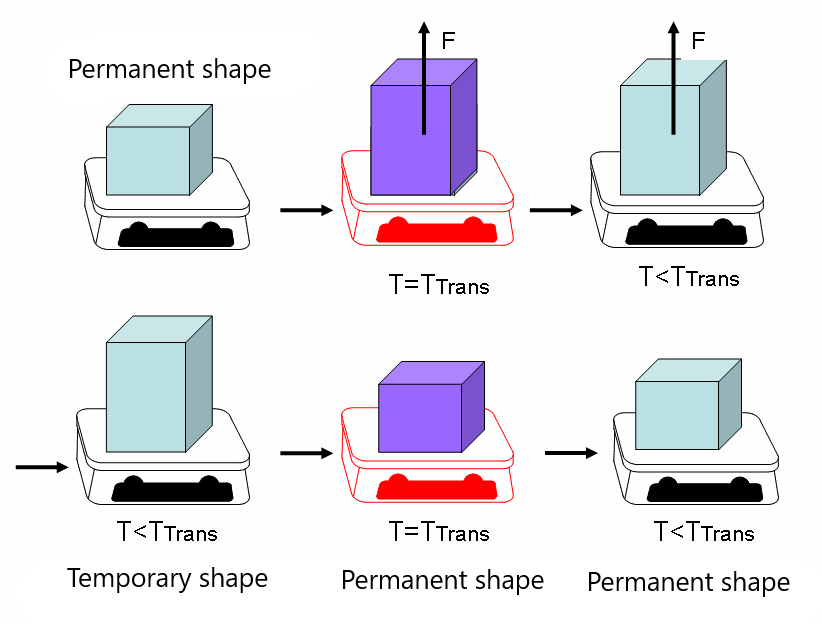
System programming steps: 1. heat up to T_{Trans}, 2. deform, 3. cool down, 4. heat up to T_{Trans}, 5. cool down.

- A commercial, high purity (non-recycled) polymer sample with known molecular mass distribution can be obtained or synthesized according to standard procedures.
- Common properties such as elastic modulus, tan δ, crystallinity, viscosity, density should be characterized.
- Anchor points, physical or chemical (chain entanglement, crystallinity or vulcanization), must be decided.

If crosslinking with slight vulcanization is desired, standardized methods for each polymer must be taken into account. In the case of PCO, for example, it is a polymer without shape-shape-memory effect because it does not present a clear "plateau", but the addition of a minimum amount of peroxide (~1%) provides PCO with all the requirements to present this effect.

1. A permanent stress-free shape with known dimensions is prepared by conventional methods.
2. The system is programmed, i.e. it is heated up to T_{Trans} and at that temperature the shape is modified by applying pressure or stress. Then the material is cooled and finally the pressure or stress is removed.
3. After heating the sample again to T_{Trans}, the stresses are released and the permanent shape is recovered.

Some polymers fatigue first, so each system can be evaluated with a simple experiment that consists of programming the system 10 or 20 times in a row and measuring the recovery in % and time.

== Crystallizable polymers ==
Polymers that can crystallize are (with the exception of PP) guarantee to obtain this effect, mainly due to their ordering capacity, which is reflected in the crystallinity, the crystals have affinity for their constituent elements and form new bonds these achieve anchoring forces that give stability to the temporary form.

=== Crystallization, vulcanization, and final properties ===
To analyze the behavior of the crystals in this type of polymers, the WAXS and DSC techniques are used; these techniques help to determine what percentage of the polymer are crystals and how they are organized. This is due to the fact that the crystallinity decreases as the crosslinking increases, since the chains lose the ability to arrange themselves and order is essential to achieve crystallinity.

A second problem present when crosslinking molecules is melting, since an excess of crosslinking modifies the molecule in such a way that it stops melting (similar to a thermoset) and therefore the temporary shape cannot be obtained.

The control of curing either by electromagnetic waves or with peroxides is very important since it increases the T_{Trans} and decreases the crystallinity, determining factors in the shape-shape-memory effect.

In the case of biocompatible semicrystalline systems such as poly(ε-caprolactone) and poly(n-butyl acrylate), crosslinked by photopolymerization it has been reported that the crystallization behavior is affected by the cooling rate, as in any other semicrystalline polymer, but the heat of crystallization remains independent of the cooling rate.

The influence of the crosslinking of the molecules, the cooling rate and the crystallization behavior are specific to each system and impossible to enumerate since the synthesis possibilities are almost infinite.

Crystallizable polymers such as oligo(ε-caprolactone) can have amorphous segments such as poly(n-butyl acrylate) and the molecular mass ratio of each determine the behavior of the system in programming temporary form and recovery to permanent form.

=== Factores que influencian el efecto ===
- Molecular mass of the crosslinked polymer.
- Molecular weight of the crystallizable polymer.
- Degree of crosslinking.
- Phase separation.
- Moduli of the original polymers and proportion in the copolymer.
- Moisture (in polymers susceptible to moisture degradation).
- Cooling speed.

== Amorphous polymers ==
If the polymeric system is amorphous, then the anchor points of the crystalline structure are not available and the only way to ensure the stability of the temporary shape is through chain entanglements (physical entanglements and not chemical crosslinking), in addition to the possibility of crosslinking.

=== Relaxation processes ===
In the glassy state, the movements of the long chain segments are frozen, the movements of these segments depend on an activation temperature that brings the polymer to a smoothing and elastic state, the rotation on the carbon bonds and the movements of the chains no longer have strong impediments to accommodate and acquire the conformation that requires less energy, the chains then "unravel" forming random strings, without order and therefore with higher entropy.

If a polymer sample is stretched for a short time in the elastic range, when the load is removed, the sample will recover its original shape, but if the load remains for a sufficiently long period, the chains rearrange and the original shape is not recovered, the result is an irreversible deformation, also called relaxation process (in this case: creep).

In order for a polymer to exhibit the thermally induced shape-memory effect, it is necessary to fix the chains with anchor points to avoid these relaxation processes that inelastically modify the system.

=== Glass transition ===
Amorphous polymers do not have a crystallization temperature (Tm) like semi-crystalline polymers and have only a glass transition temperature (Tg). This has a decisive influence on the behavior of shape-shape-memory polymer systems.

A crystalline copolymer system alone can result in the crosslinker-treated copolymer losing its crystallinity and becoming practically amorphous.

An amorphous polymer depends on the level of crosslinking or the degree of polymerization to exhibit this effect. In the case of poly(norbornene), which is a linear, amorphous polymer, with a content of 70 to 80% of trans bonds in commercial products, molecular mass of approximately 3x106 g mol^{−1} and Tg of approximately 35 to 45°C. Because it achieves an unusually high degree of polymerization, chain entanglements can be relied upon as anchor points to achieve the thermally induced shape-memory effect. Therefore, this polymer relies solely on physical anchor points. When heated up to Tg, the material abruptly changes from a rigid state to a tapered state (softens). To achieve the effect, the shape must be changed rapidly to avoid rearrangement of the segments of the polymer chains and immediately cool the material also very rapidly below Tg. Reheating the material back to Tg will show the recovery of the original shape.

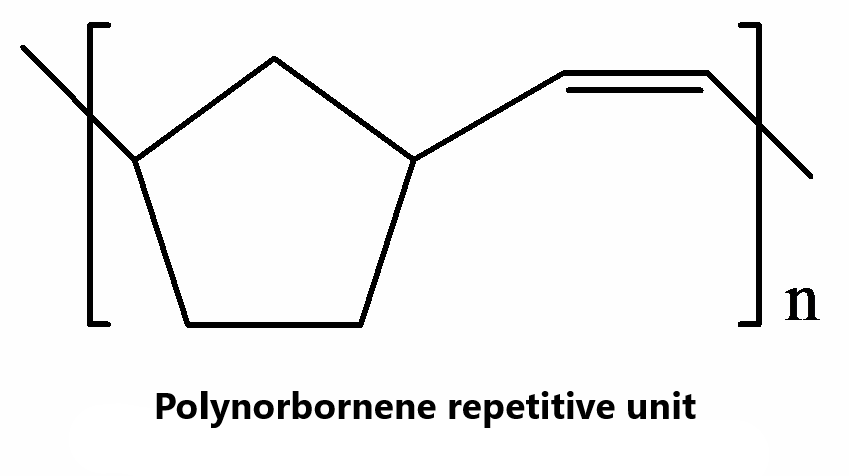

=== Influence of chemical structure ===
In designing copolymers for thermally induced shape-memory effect it is very important to keep in mind that a slight change in chemical structure (cis/trans ratios, tacticity, molecular mass, etc.) produces a significant change in the shape-memory polymer. An example is the copolymer of poly(methylmethacrylate-co-methacrylic acid) or poly(MAA-co-MMA) compared to poly(MAA-co-MMA)-PEG, where PEG is short for poly(ethylene glycol) which forms complexes in the copolymer.

Changes in the morphology of the material including PEG provide shape-memory effect to the copolymer, showing two phases, the three-dimensional network providing a stable phase and the reversible phase formed by the amorphous part of the PEG-PMAA complexes. The complexes show a high modulus storage capacity, so when a PEG of higher molecular mass is introduced into the copolymer, an increase in the elastic modulus, higher modulus in the glassy state and faster recovery are observed.

Its properties can be studied with differential scanning calorimetry (DSC), wide-angle X-ray diffraction (WAXD) and dynamic mechanical analysis (DMA) techniques to determine its physicochemical arrangement.

== Overview ==
- For a polymer to exhibit the thermally induced shape-memory effect, it must have anchor points for temporary and permanent shape. These can be physical (chain entanglements, crystals) or chemical (chemical crosslinking, curing, vulcanization).
- This effect in polymers depends on entropic forces and not on martensitic transitions like metals.
- The most important physical properties are: elastic modulus, recovery speed, temporary shape stability.
- The transition temperature T_{Trans} can be Tm or Tg or a mixture of both.
- All crystalline polymers (except for PP) can exhibit thermally induced shape-memory effect.
- Inelastic mechanisms that decrease the effect are: moisture degradation (for moisture sensitive polymers e.g. polyurethanes), unraveling of the chains, degradation of the bonds that fix the permanent or temporary shape.

== Applications ==
Most of the applications of polymers with this effect are only suggestions for now, many possibilities have been proposed, but so far only a few have been used, the most important being medical devices and automotive elements, although the greatest success has been achieved with heat-shrinkable polyethylene, which is also an exception in the programming step, since it is processed in a different way.

=== Healthcare applications ===
- Orthodontic items, such as wires and foams for endovascular procedures.
- Microelements for intelligent suturing.
- Intravenous needles that soften in the body and laparoscopy devices
- Drug delivery systems.
- In-body degradable implants for minimally invasive surgeries.
- Inner soles of orthopedic or special needs shoes and utensils for people with disabilities.
- Intravenous catheters.

=== Everyday life applications ===
- Seals for adjustable pipes and fittings, shrinkable or adjustable pipes.
- Braille reprintable boards and reprintable advertisements.
- Adjustable anti-corrosion films.
- Hair for dolls, toys, hair styling items.
- New items packaged in smaller volume and that change their shape upon first use.
- Protections for automobiles, fenders, etc.
- Artificial nails.
- Smart textiles.

== See also ==
- Shape-shape-memory polymer
- Shape-shape-memory alloy
- Polymer
- Copolymer
- Smart material

== Bibliographical references ==
- Charlesby A. Atomic Radiation and Polymers. Pergamon Press, Oxford, pp. 198–257 (1960).
- Gall, K; Dunn, M; Liu, Y. Internal stress storage in shape shape-memory polymer nanocomposites. Applied physical letters. 85, (Jul-2004).
- Jeong, Han Mo; Song H, Chi W. Shape-shape-memory effect of poly (methylene-1,3-cyclopentane) and its copolymer with polyethylene. Polymer International, 51:275-280 (2002).
- Kawate, K. Creep Recovery of Acrylate Urethane Oligomer/Acrylate Networks. Creep recovery, shape shape-memory. Journal of polymer science. 35.
- Kim B K, Lee S Y, Xu M. Polyurethanes having shape-shape-memory effects. Polymer 37: 5781–93, (1998).
- Langer, R; Tirrell, D. A. Designing materials for biology and medicine. Nature 428: (Apr-2004).
- Lendlein, A; Kelch, S; Kratz, K. Shape-shape-memory Polymers. Encyclopedia of Materials: Science and Technology. 1–9. (2005).
- Lendlein, A; Langer, R. Biodegradable, elastic shape-shape-memory polymers for potential biomedical applications. Science. 296, 1673–1676 (2002).
- Lendlein, A; Kelch, S. Shape-Memory Polymers. Angew. Chemie. Chem. Int. 41: 2034 – 2057. (2002).
- Lendlein, A; Schmidt, A M; Langer R, AB-polymer networks based on oligo(ε-caprolactone) segments showing shape-shape-memory properties. Proc. Natl. Acad. Sci. USA. 98(3): 842–7 (2001).
- Li F, Chen Y, Zhu W, Zhang X, Xu M. Shape shape-memory effects of polyethylene/nylon 6 graft copolymers. Polymer 39(26):6929–6934 (1998).
- Liu, Chun, Mather. Chemically Cross-Linked Polycyclooctene: Synthesis, Characterization, and Shape Memory Behavior. Macromolecules, 35: 9868-9874 (2002).
- Nakasima A, Hu J, Ichinosa M, Shimada H. Potential application of shape-shape-memory plastic as elastic material in clinical orthodontics. (1991) Eur. J. Orthodontics 13:179–86.
- Ortega, Alicia M; Gall, Ken. The Effect of Crosslink Density on the Thermo-Mechanical Response of Shape Memory Polymers.
- Peng P; Wang, W; Xuesi C; and Jing X. Poly(ε-caprolactone) Polyurethane and Its Shape-Memory Property. Biomacromolecules 6:587-592 (2005).
- Wang, M; Zhang, L. Recovery as a Measure of Oriented Crystalline Structure in Poly (ether ester) s Based on Poly (ethylene oxide) and poly(ethylene terephthalate) Used as Shape Memory Polymers. Journal of Polymer Science: Part B: Polymer Physics, 37: 101–112 (1999).
- Yiping C. Ying G; Juan D; Juan L; Yuxing P; Albert S. Hydrogen-bonded polymer network—poly (ethylene glycol) complexes with shape shape-memory effect. Journal of Materials Chemistry. 12: 2957–2960 (2002).
- Katime I, Katime O, Katime D "Los materiales inteligentes de este Milenio: los hidrogeles polímeros". Editorial de la Universidad del País Vasco, Bilbao 2004. ISBN 84-8373-637-3.
- Katime I, Katime O y Katime D."Introducción a la Ciencia de los materiales polímeros: Síntesis y caracterización". Servicio Editorial de la Universidad del País Vasco, Bilbao 2010. ISBN 978-84-9860-356-9
