= Armwrestling match of EAP robotic arm against human =

The armwrestling match of EAP robotic arm against human (AMERAH) is a challenge posed by Yoseph Bar-Cohen of the JPL in 1999. The initial challenge is to create a simple human-like robotic arm which, using electroactive polymers (EAP) as artificial muscles, can beat a human opponent (e.g., a high school student) in an arm wrestling match. The ultimate goal, however, is to create an arm using EAP as similar as possible to a human arm, which can beat any human in an arm wrestling competition. The competition aims to stimulate research in the field of electroactive polymers, as well as arouse interest both in the general public and among potential investors.

The first trial was held on March 7, 2005, at the International Society for Optical Engineering's (SPIE) 2005 Electroactive Polymer Actuators and Devices (EAPAD) conference in San Diego, California. Three teams entered robotic contestants:

- Environmental Robots Incorporated, of Albuquerque, New Mexico;
- The Swiss Federal Laboratories for Materials Testing and Research (EMPA), of Dübendorf, Switzerland;
- A team of three undergraduate students from the Virginia Polytechnic Institute and State University: Steven Deso, Stephen Ros, and Noah Papas, advised by John Cotton, an associate professor.

The human opponent was Panna Felsen, a straight-A high school student from the San Diego school district with an interest in robotics. She beat all three robotic contenders easily, one in just three seconds.

== See also ==
- Electroactive polymers
