= Photomechanical effect =

Change in the shape of a material when exposed to light

Photomechanical effect is the change in the shape of a material when it is exposed to light. This effect was first documented by Alexander Graham Bell in 1880. Kenji Uchino demonstrated that a photostrictive material could be used for legs in the construction of a miniature optically-powered "walker".

The most common mechanism of photomechanical effect is light-induced heating.

Photomechanical materials may be considered smart materials due to their natural change implemented by external factors.

== See also ==
- Smart materials
