= Ionic polymer–metal composites =

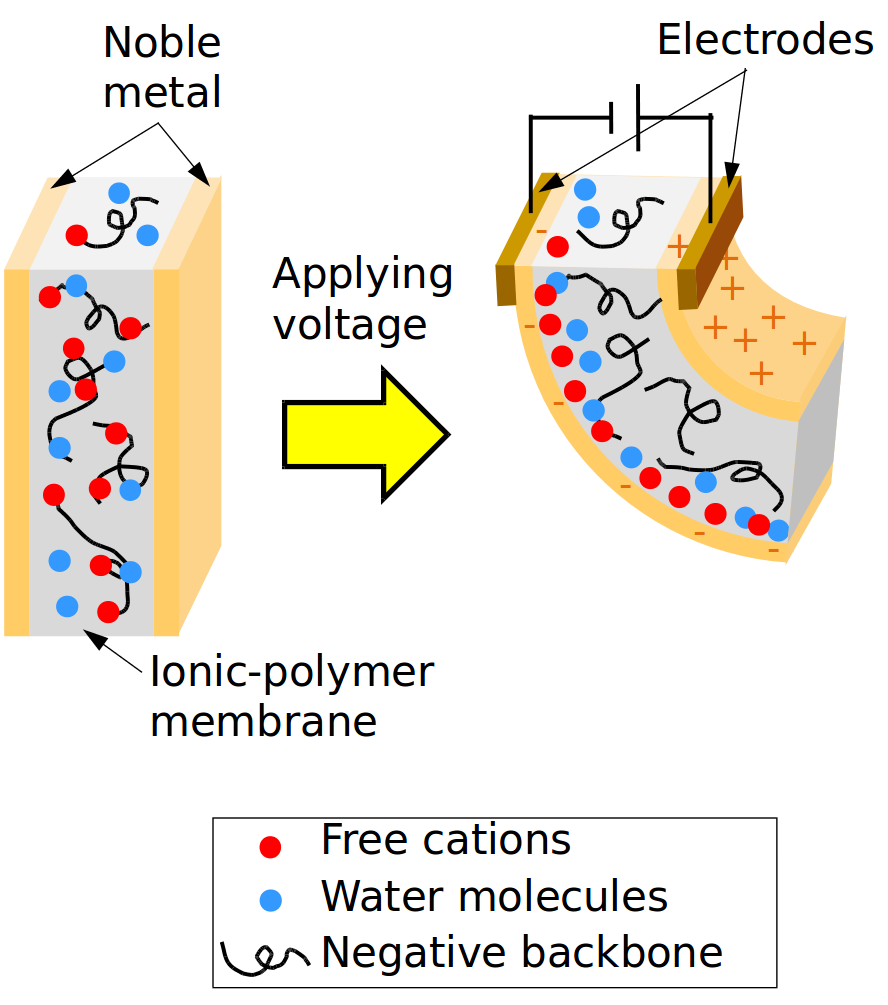
IPMC actuation, energy harvesting and sensing principles. When a voltage (electric field) is applied to the electrodes, positively charged conjugated and hydrated cations in the membrane molecular network are repulsed by the anode and migrate towards the negative electrode or the cathode carrying the hydrated water molecules with them. This migration creates an osmotic pressure gradient across the membrane causing the IPMC strip to bend or deform in a spectacular manner. On the other hand, mechanically bending or deforming the IPMC strips causes the conjugated cations to move around and this creates an electric potential and output voltage and transient current (energy harvesting, sensing modes) based on the Poisson–Nernst–Planck field theories. Hydrated water molecules are bonded with cations as they migrate around. However, if there are non-hydrated loose water molecules dragged with the hydrated cations as added mass towards the anode, once bending or deformation equilibrium is achieved the loose water molecules flow back towards the cathode and some back-relaxation may be observed.

Ionic polymer–metal composites (IPMCs) are synthetic composite nanomaterials that display artificial muscle behavior under an applied voltage or electric field. IPMCs are composed of an ionic polymer like Nafion or Flemion whose surfaces are chemically plated or physically coated with conductors such as platinum or gold. Under an applied voltage (1–5 V for typical 10 mm × 40 mm × 0.2 mm samples), ion migration and redistribution due to the imposed voltage across a strip of IPMCs result in a bending deformation. Also, IPMCs can be ionic hydrogel which is being immersed in an electrolyte solution and connected to the electric field indirectly.

If the plated electrodes are arranged in a non-symmetric configuration, the imposed voltage can induce a variety of deformations such as twisting, rolling, torsioning, turning, twirling, whirling and non-symmetric bending deformation. Alternatively, if such deformations are physically applied to an IPMC strips they generate an output voltage signal (few millivolts for typical small samples) as sensors and energy harvesters. IPMCs are a type of electroactive polymer. They work very well in a liquid environment as well as in air. They have a force density of about 40 in a cantilever configuration, meaning that they can generate a tip force of almost 40 times their own weight in a cantilever mode. IPMCs in actuation, sensing and energy harvesting have a very broad bandwidth to kilo HZ and higher. IPMCs were first introduced in 1998 by Shahinpoor, Bar-Cohen, Xue, Simpson and Smith (see references below) but the original idea of ionic polymer actuators and sensors goes back to 1992-93 by Adolf, Shahinpoor, Segalman, Witkowski, Osada, Okuzaki, Hori, Doi, Matsumoto, Hirose, Oguro, Takenaka, Asaka and Kawami as depicted below:

1-Segalman D. J., Witkowski W. R., Adolf D. B., Shahinpoor M.,"Theory and Application of Electrically Controlled Polymeric Gels", Int. Journal of Smart Material and Structures, vol. 1, pp. 95–100, (1992)
2-Shahinpoor M.,"Conceptual Design, Kinematics and Dynamics of Swimming Robotic Structures Using Ionic Polymeric Gel Muscles", Int. Journal of Smart Material and Structures, vol.1, pp. 91–94, (1992)
3-Y. Osada, H. Okuzaki and H. Hori, "A Polymer Gel with Electrically Driven Motility", Nature, vol. 355, pp. 242–244, (1992)
4-Oguro K., Kawami Y.and Takenaka H.,"Bending of an Ion-Conducting Polymer Film Electrode Composite by An Electric Stimulus at Low Voltage", Trans. J. Micro-Machine Society, vol. 5, pp. 27–30, (1992)
5-M. Doi, M. Marsumoto and Y. Hirose, "Deformation of Ionic Gels by Electric Fields", Macromolecules, vol. 25, pp. 5504–5511, (1992)
6-Oguro, K., K. Asaka, and H. Takenaka, "Polymer film actuator driven by low voltage", In Proceedings of the 4th International Symposium of Micro Machines and Human Science", Nagoya, pp. 38–40, (1993)
7-Adolf D., Shahinpoor M., Segalman D., Witkowski W.,"Electrically Controlled Polymeric Gel Actuators", US Patent Office, US Patent No. 5,250,167, Issued October 5, (1993)
8-Oguro K., Kawami Y.and Takenaka H.,"Actuator Element", US Patent Office, US Patent No. 5,268,082, Issued December 7, (1993)

These patents were followed by additional related patents:

9-Shahinpoor, M., "Spring-Loaded Ionic Polymeric Gel Linear Actuator", US Patent Office, US Patent No. 5,389,222, Issued February 14,(1995)
10-Shahinpoor, M. and Mojarrad, M., "Soft Actuators and Artificial Muscles", US Patent Office, United States Patent 6,109,852, Issued August 29,(2000)
11-Shahinpoor, M. and Mojarrad, M.,"Ionic Polymer Sensors and Actuators", US Patent Office, No. 6,475,639, Issued November 5, (2002)
12-Shahinpoor, M. and Kim, K.J.,“Method of Fabricating a Dry Electro-Active Polymeric Synthetic Muscle”, US Patent Office, Patent No. 7,276,090, Issued October 2,(2007)
It should also be mentioned that Tanaka, Nishio and Sun introduced the phenomenon of ionic gel collapse in an electric field:
13-T. Tanaka, I. Nishio and S.T. Sun, "Collapse of Gells in an Electric Field", Science, vol. 218, pp. 467–469, (1982)

It should also be mentioned that Hamlen, Kent and Shafer introduced the electrochemical contraction of ionic polymer fibers:

14-R. P. Hamlen, C. E. Kent and S. N. Shafer, "Electrolytically Activated Contractile Polymer", Nature, vol. 206, no. 4989, pp. 1140–1141, (1965)

Credit should also be extended to Darwin G. Caldwell and Paul M. Taylor for early work on chemically stimulated gels as artificial muscles:

15-Darwin G. Caldwell and Paul M. Taylor,"Chemically stimulated pseudo-muscular actuation", International Journal of Engineering Science, Volume 28, Issue 8, pp. 797–808, (1990)
