= International Postgraduate Medical College =

The International Postgraduate Medical College (abbreviated IPMC) is a tax-exempt, non-profit educational institution based currently in Jamaica, with the main purpose to provide postgraduate medical and dental education.

It has two faculties: The Faculty of Dentistry (very active) and the Faculty of Medicine (currently active by way of its Basic Medical Science Departments activities). The two faculties currently prepare dentists for membership in the Royal College of Surgeons of Ireland. It also trains dentists in the specialized field of oral surgery, oral implantology, oral radiology and diagnosis, and anatomy education for the purpose of acquiring higher education. The college which itself developed exclusively from the help and encouragement of the International Congress of Oral Implantologists, currently awards master's degrees and diplomas in specialized dental areas.

The founder of the college is Christopher Ogunsalu, the inventor of the Ogunsalu Sandwich bone regeneration technique.

== See also ==
- List of medical schools in the Caribbean
