= Ultrasound-triggered drug delivery using stimuli-responsive hydrogels =

Ultrasound-Responsive Hydrogel-Based Drug Delivery

Ultrasound-triggered drug delivery using stimuli-responsive hydrogels refers to the process of using ultrasound energy for inducing drug release from hydrogels that are sensitive to acoustic stimuli. This method of approach is one of many stimuli-responsive drug delivery-based systems that has gained traction in recent years due to its demonstration of localization and specificity of disease treatment. Although recent developments in this field highlight its potential in treating certain diseases such as COVID-19, there remain many major challenges that need to be addressed and overcome before more related biomedical applications are clinically translated into standard of care.

== Types of Hydrogels Used in Drug Delivery Systems ==
=== Traditional Hydrogels ===
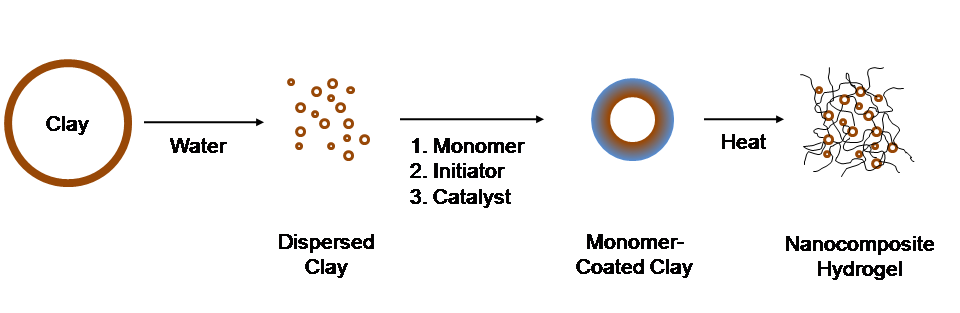
Figure 1.0 – Synthesis process of nanocomposite hydrogels

Hydrogels are three dimensional structures consisting of hydrophilic polymers (i.e., polymers, colloids, etc.) that form networks through cross-linking processes. The macromolecules involved in the formation of hydrogels are able to absorb and retain large amounts of water and other aqueous substances. Since its discovery in 1960, hydrogels have become a crucial component in biomedical research and applications. A few examples of hydrogel use include organ regeneration, wound healing, and drug delivery. Hydrogels are generally classified based on the following characteristics: material, crosslinking mechanism, physical structure, electric charge, and response to stimuli. Synthesis of hydrogels are developed from a combination or isolated forms of natural and synthetic polymers. The main examples of natural polymers used to derive hydrogels include polysaccharides, polypeptides, and polynucleotides. Several known examples of synthetic polymeric constituents include poly (vinyl alcohol) (PVA), poly (acrylic acid) (PAA), and poly (2-hydroxyethyl methacrylate) (PHEMA). The crosslinking mechanism of the hydrophilic macromolecules are driven by covalent bonding, resulting in a physical- or chemical-type hydrogel. Physical hydrogels contain reversible matrices of hydrogen and non-covalent bonds, while chemical hydrogels are composed of irreversible matrices that are molecularly held together by covalent bonds. Used as another parameter in characterizing gels, electric charge (also referred to as ionic character) describes the ability of the macromolecules to drive swelling behavior. Hydrogels classified based on this property fall under three main categories: cationic, anionic, and amphoteric. Bawa et al. demonstrated that cationic gels swell in acidic environments but remain condensed in basic environments.

=== Smart Hydrogel Polymers ===
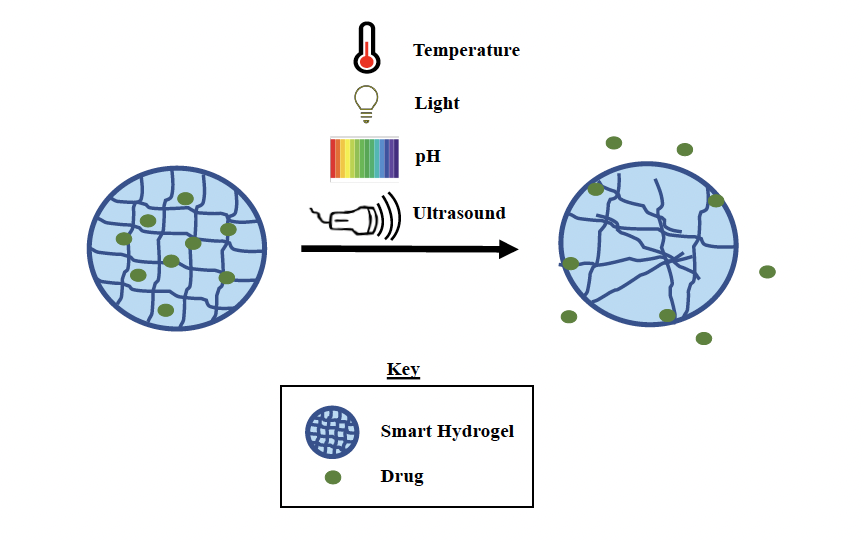
Figure 2.0 - Various examples of stimuli inducing drug release from loaded-smart hydrogels

Since traditional hydrogels were able to encapsulate and carry materials, research into drug-loaded hydrogels began to expand in the field of drug delivery. Dubbed as "smart hydrogels" or "stimuli-responsive hydrogels", these gels are able to dynamically respond to external or internal stimuli in addition to possessing similar swelling-deswelling properties of traditional hydrogels. Various examples of external stimuli that have been used to control smart hydrogels in drug delivery systems include temperature, pH, light, ultrasound, and enzymes. Additional considerations in designing smart hydrogels involve fundamental understanding of bond strength, molecular weight, degree of polymerization, polymer structure, and molecular assembly. The bond strength describes the cross-linking strength of the hydrogel, which is considered in designing drug release mechanisms of hydrogel-based platforms. Scientific understanding of the molecular weight of gels is taken into account when loading drugs of increasing weight. Similar to conventional hydrogels, the polymeric chain (or backbone) of the smart hydrogels is derived from polysaccharides, polypeptides, and polynucleotides. Examples of natural polymers include alginate, chitosan, cellulose, gelatin, fibrin, and collagen. Hydrogel size and type are the two main properties considered in designing hydrogels when seeking the optimal delivery route for drug administration. Various examples of hydrogel type designs include nanoparticles, nanogels, and microgels. For example, El-Sherbiny et al. proposed gelatin-based hydrogel nanoparticles that were stimulated by magnetic forces. Other variables considered in hydrogel design include safety, biodegradability, drug loading capacity, and on-demand control of drug release [23]. The main safety concerns in formulating hydrogels include bacterial infection and biocompatibility. The final parameter considered in developing hydrogels for drug delivery systems revolve around the embedded payload within the hydrogel. Cells, proteins, and therapeutic drugs are the main payloads used in hydrogel-based drug delivery platforms. In one example of payload use, Jiang et al. demonstrated the stimulated release of gallic acid from chitin-based hydrogel via ultrasound induction.

== Use of Ultrasound for Drug Therapy ==
=== General Overview of Ultrasound ===
According to the Moyano et al., ultrasound refers to vibrational mechanical waves with frequencies greater than 20 kilohertz (kHz). Ultrasound is traditionally used for imaging, monitoring, and diagnosing a broad range of conditions in the medical field. Various examples of ultrasound modalities include Doppler ultrasound, focused ultrasound, and echocardiography. The key component of using most ultrasound devices is a transducer that consists of an array of piezoelectric crystals. The atoms within these crystals vibrate under electrical current stimulation, converting this electrical energy into mechanical, in this case, high acoustic or ultrasonic energy. When the sonicating transducer is directed at the human body, the resulting sound pressure waves produced by the transducer will pass through the dermal layer and reach the tissue where the waves are reflected (or echoed) back to the transducer and converted back into electrical signals for image reconstruction. Tissue characteristics such as density affect the intensity of the reflected sound waves. Other parameters such as beam frequency, equipment components, and imaging settings contribute towards the resolution of the ultrasound application. Ultrasound has also been used for therapeutic purposes because it is non-invasiveness, able to provide deeper tissue penetration, and safely localize application of acoustic energy.

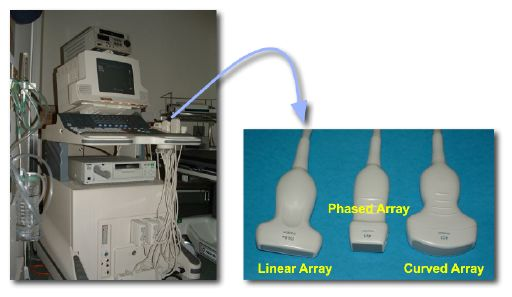
Figure 3.0 - Example of ultrasound machine and different types of associated transducers

While ultrasound modalities are generally considered safe, extreme levels of human exposure to ultrasound can increase injury risk. In the US, the Food and Drug Administration (FDA) guidelines, the maximum allowed exposure to ultrasound for use is defined by the following key parameters: mechanical index, thermal index, spatial-peak temporal-peak intensity, spatial-peak pulse-average power, and spatial-peak temporal-average power. Mechanical index (MI) is a unitless metric that is used to measure the acoustic power output from ultrasound use. Since the MI is inversely proportional to the ultrasonic beam frequency, the MI will be lower at higher frequencies. The thermal index (TI) describes the risk of increasing the temperature of the tissue being sonicated by ultrasound. A solution to decreasing TI involves the reduction of the time that the sonicating transducer is focused on the targeted area. The spatial-peak temporal-peak (SPTP) power refers to the highest intensity output of the ultrasound beam during implementation. The spatial-peak pulse-average (SPPA) power is a measure of the maximum intensity output averaged over the duration of ultrasound use in. The spatial-peak temporal-average power describes the measure of the highest intensity output generated by the repeating pulse of the ultrasound beam over a period of time.

=== Effects of Focused Ultrasound on Smart Hydrogels ===
Due to the sonication capability of ultrasound and drug-release property of smart hydrogels, there has been scientific interest in controlling the release of the payload from hydrogels. Focusing and directing acoustic energy (that can convert to thermal or mechanical energy) towards smart hydrogels, implanted within tissue at times, induces a hydrogel response that results in the release of the embedded payload. Although hydrogels that are sensitive to mechanical pressure are generally used in ultrasound-triggered drug delivery platforms, hydrogels that respond to changes in temperature have also been used for these systems. For example, Makhmalzadeh et al. proposed an ultrasound-triggered drug delivery method involving the use of thermo-responsive hydrogels loaded with silibinin, a cancer drug for treating melanoma. At low temperatures, these thermo-responsive hydrogels exist in liquid form but following ultrasonication, they transition into a gel state. Although ultrasound- and thermo-sensitive hydrogels are responsive to certain ultrasound modalities, they differ in how they respond to external stimuli. Ultrasound-responsive hydrogels are capable of being stimulated by more than one type of stimulation force through ultrasound. Conversely, thermo-responsive hydrogels, as the name specifies, can only respond to the thermal forces induced by ultrasound. Despite this, thermo-responsive hydrogels have been widely used in cancer-based drug delivery systems.

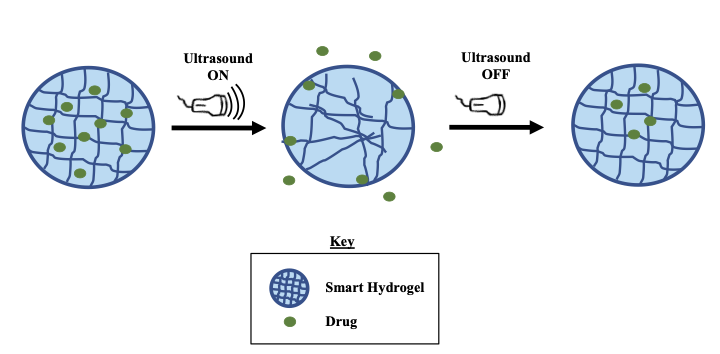
Figure 4.0 - Activation of ultrasound disrupts hydrogel matrix and allows for drug release. Turning off ultrasound allows for hydrogel to restore its matrix

Of the existing ultrasound modalities, focused ultrasound has been used extensively in drug delivery research. High-Intensity Focused Ultrasound (HIFU) and Low-Intensity Focused Ultrasound are the two main techniques used in inducing drug release from smart hydrogels. Current HIFU applications are used for ablating tumors located at increased depths. Since HIFU is able to invoke high temperatures, they have been used for cancer therapy by stimulating drug release from smart hydrogels via thermolysis mechanisms. In regard to the use of ultrasound- and thermo-responsive hydrogels for drug delivery, HIFU is able to stimulate both types of hydrogels. In one study related to cancer therapy, HIFU exhibited high efficiency inducing nanovaccine release from hydrogel-based carriers. Although HIFU has been studied in various capacities, this technique can cause irreparable damage to healthy tissue. Therefore, LIFU has been the conventional method for use in hydrogel responsive drug delivery platforms. In other areas of the biomedical field, LIFU has been used for stimulation such as bone regeneration in tissue engineering applications. Due to its lower generated acoustic power output, LIFU is preferred over HIFU in biomedical applications involving neuromodulation and other brain-related procedures. Studies have shown that LIFU has proven to be a cost-effective and non-invasive method for hydrogel-based drug delivery.

The underlying drug-releasing mechanism induced by focused ultrasound onto ultrasound-sensitive hydrogels is based on mechanical or thermal effects. Mechanical-based ultrasound sonication mechanisms refer to the conversion of acoustic energy into mechanical energy with various types that include acoustic cavitation force, or oscillation force. Generally, applying mechanical pressure to a responsive hydrogel loaded with drugs causes the hydrogel to deform. This deformation reduces the structural integrity of the hydrophobic core, allowing for the release of the drug payload. Both ultrasound- and thermo- responsive hydrogels are capable of carrying various embedded carriers of drug payloads which include metal-organic framework, nanoparticles, and liposomes. Although many studies have demonstrated the irreversible compression of hydrogels induced under ultrasound, Goncalves et al. designed hydrogel-based nanoparticles that were capable of "self-healing", meaning they were able to return to their original form following drug release from its depot.

Acoustic cavitation forces, specifically, have been used in conjunction with ultrasound-responsive hydrogels for drug delivery. This type of mechanical force refers to the formation, growth, and destruction of bubble occurs that results in the generation of acoustic energy. There are varying degrees of cavitation which divided into three groups: sonoporation, stable cavitation, and inertial cavitation. Sonoporation refers to the process of using ultrasound to open pores (or permeability) of cellular membranes to allow substances of interest to enter into the targeted cell. In cases where microbubbles are coated with hydrogels, these embedded carrier systems undergo stable cavitation and inertial cavitation. Stable cavitation characterizes vapor bubbles that oscillate within its own equilibrium, while inertial cavitation describes bubbles that generate a net growth each time the bubble expands and results in the bubble collapsing violently. Severe cavitation increases the risk of damage to tissue and drug degradation. Other forces generated by ultrasound that is used in several hydrogel-based platforms are hyperthermia and radiation. These forces are generally created by HIFU as they generate high levels of heat. Thus, guidelines established by the FDA help ensure the safe use of ultrasound in all biomedical applications, inclusive of drug delivery systems, based on the scientific understanding of these mechanical forces.

== Drug delivery applications and effects ==
=== Tissue engineering ===
In regard to tissues, ultrasound is generally used for imaging and monitoring tissue pathologies. Due to its ability to penetrate through tissue easily, ultrasound has been widely studied and developed for drug delivery applications in the field of tissue engineering. In order for hydrogels to release drugs at the targeted location, they must be injected or implanted within the tissue. Injection of hydrogels is usually preferred over implantation due to its minimal invasiveness, reduced healing time following the procedure, and biocompatibility. In one study, Liu et al. proposed a novel design of injectable chemotaxis hydrogels to help promote the migration of bone marrow mesenchymal cells for cartilage repair. Other examples of using smart hydrogels and ultrasound in tissue engineering applications include cartilage repair, bone repair, and wound healing. The design of these drug delivery platforms is specific to each tissue type and its intended use.

=== Cancer treatment ===
In the field of cancer, ultrasound is commonly used for helping health care professionals detect and develop a diagnosis in affected patients. In the context of drug delivery, ultrasound has been used for a wide variety of therapeutic applications which include but are not limited to melanoma, ovarian cancer, and breast cancer. Hydrogels are generally used in designing these drug delivery platforms due to minimal invasiveness (if injected) and its ability to carry a different cancer drugs. These hydrogel-based systems are also paired with chemotherapy treatments. Cancer drugs used in this drug delivery platforms include doxorubicin, mitoxantrone, paclitaxel, silibinin, and cisplatin. In a cancer therapy study, Baghbani et al. proposed a method of pairing ultrasound with doxorubicin-loaded alginate-stabilized perfluorohexane (PFH) nanodroplets.

=== Gene therapy ===
Although it is generally used in combination with cancer therapeutic treatments, gene therapy has become a topic of interest in the drug delivery field. Gene therapy refers to the insertion of genes into a biological system in an attempt to add or modify mutated genes for therapeutic benefit. In order to attain high transgene expression, the electrostatic interaction between the gene and hydrogel polymer and the controlled release of the drug payload from the hydrogel is necessary. Several gene therapy drugs used in hydrogel-based drug delivery systems include CRISPR/Cas9, siRNA, and other RNA-based drugs. In a gene therapy study, Han et al. proposed a focused ultrasound-responsive hydrogel-based system for delivering siRNA nanoparticles to the targeted tumor site

== Challenges and future development ==
The main challenge for future ultrasound-triggered hydrogel responsive delivery systems is to develop safer guidelines for using HIFU to take advantage of its benefits. In doing so, this will lead to improvements on FDA guidelines for ultrasound use. Therefore, the use of LIFU or lower acoustic energy intensity settings is suggested as the conventional method for decreasing injury risk, specifically damage to healthy tissue, until then. Focused ultrasound continues to be the primary type of ultrasound technique used in drug delivery systems. Another challenge presented in using ultrasound for inducing drug release from smart hydrogels in delivery platforms is inappropriate drug administration and unexpected complications. Currently, on-demand drug release from ultrasound-responsive hydrogels is still difficult to fully control when only using ultrasound. Yeingst et al. suggested that future hydrogel-based delivery platforms will be designed based on the drug payload to optimize the interaction between the ultrasound and stimuli-responsive hydrogel. Future development of drug delivery systems will continue to incorporate ultrasound and smart hydrogel designs.
