= Yoseph Bar-Cohen =

American physicist

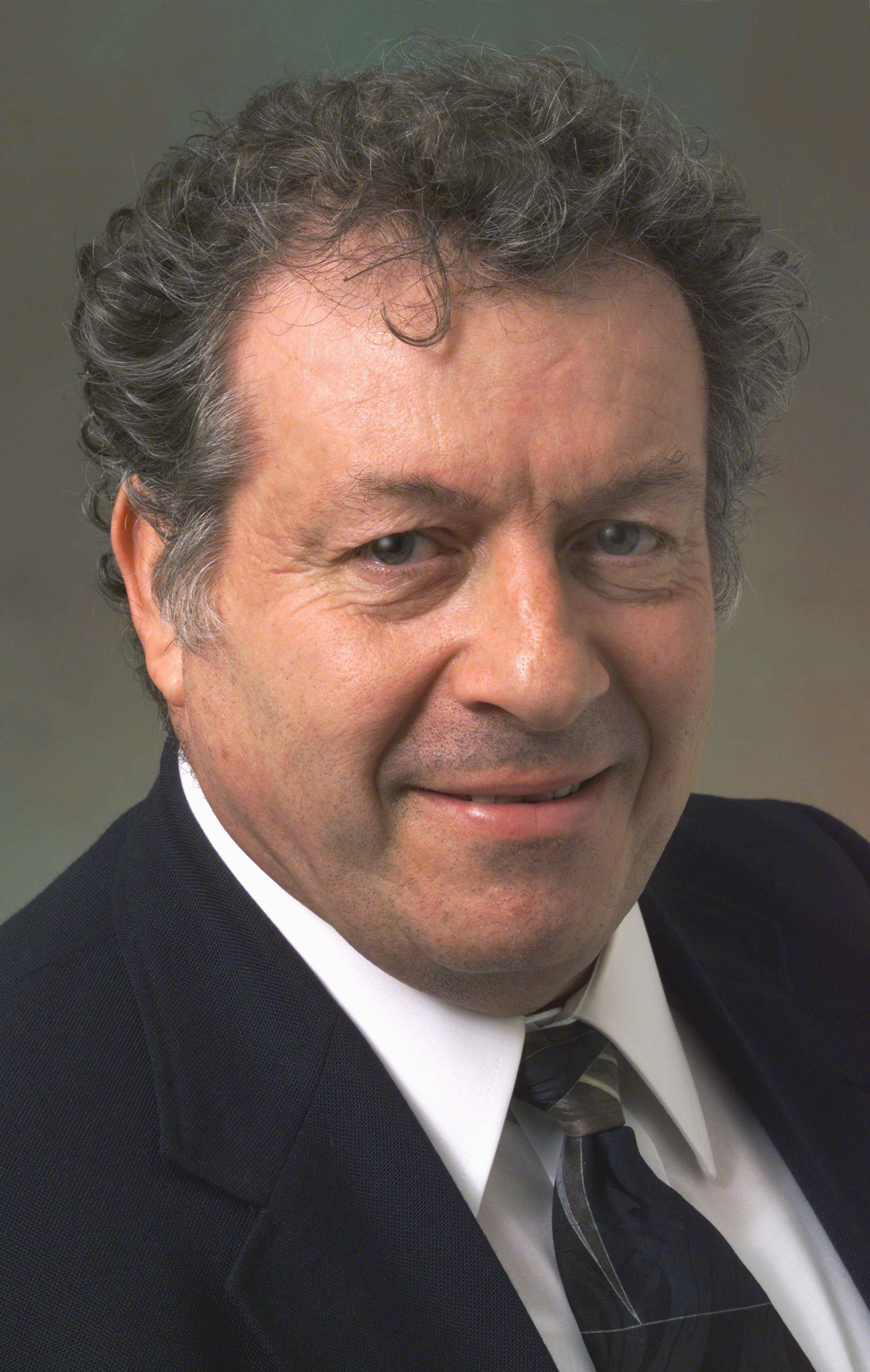
Yoseph Bar-Cohen

Yoseph Bar-Cohen (Hebrew: יוסף בר-כהן), known as Yosi, is a physicist retiree from the Jet Propulsion Laboratory (JPL) after about 35 years. As of July 17, 2026, he is a Senior Research Scientist Emeritus. He specialized in electroactive materials driven mechanisms and ultrasonic nondestructive evaluation (NDE), and was also responsible for the JPL's Nondestructive Evaluation and Advance Actuators (NDEAA) lab. Formerly at JPL, he was a Group Supervisor and a Senior Research Scientist. Bar-Cohen is a fellow of the International Society for Optical Engineering (SPIE) and the American Society for Nondestructive Testing (ASNT).

He has 43 registered patents, edited and coauthored 12 books, co-authored 460+ publications, and co-chaired 56 international conferences. Using ultrasonic waves in composite materials, he discovered the polar backscattering (1979) and leaky lamb waves (1983) phenomena.

Bar-Cohen received M.Sc. degree in materials science in 1973 and Ph.D. in physics in 1979, both from the Hebrew University in Jerusalem.

In March 1999, Bar-Cohen started the SPIE's Electroactive Polymer Actuators and Devices (EAPAD) conference, which he has chaired twenty two times. In the opening, he announced a challenge to the science and engineering communities to win an Armwrestling match of EAP actuated robotic arm against human [https://www.emerald.com/ir/article/doi/10.1108/ir.2005.04932fab.003/182854]
