= Smart material =

Material that can be externally controlled

Smart materials, also called intelligent or responsive materials, are designed materials that have one or more properties that can be significantly changed in a controlled fashion by external stimuli, such as stress, moisture, electric or magnetic fields, light, temperature, pH, or chemical compounds. Smart materials are the basis of many applications, including sensors and actuators, or artificial muscles, particularly as electroactive polymers (EAPs).

== Types ==
There are a wide array of smart materials, each classified by its functional mechanism. Examples include:

Electromechanical: Responsive to electrical and/or mechanical stimuli.

- Piezoelectric materials can produce a voltage when mechanical stress is applied. This effect also applies in a reverse manner, a voltage applied across the material will produce mechanical stress within sample. Therefore structures made from these materials can be designed to bend, expand, or contract when a voltage is applied.
- Electroactive polymers (EAPs) change their volume with applied electrical stimulation.
- Dielectric elastomers (DEs) are smart material systems which produce large strains (up to 500%) when an external voltage is applied.

Magnetic Responsive: Responsive to an exposure to or change of a magnetic field.

- Magnetostrictive materials exhibit a change in volume when exposed to a magnetic field and when mechanically stressed can produce a magnetic field of its own.
- Magnetic shape memory alloys are materials that change their shape in response to a significant change in the magnetic field.
- Ferrofluids are magnetic fluids composed of suspended nanoscale ferromagnetic particles that are affected by magnetic fields.
- Magnetocaloric materials are compounds that undergo a change in temperature upon exposure to a changing magnetic field.

Shape Memory: The ability to return to an original shape after deformation. This transformation can be controlled through a change in temperature, magnetic field, electric field, or light.

- Shape-memory alloys and shape-memory polymers are materials in which large deformation can be induced and the original shape recovered through temperature or stress changes (pseudoelasticity). The shape memory effect results due to respectively martensitic phase change and induced elasticity at higher temperatures. A common example is nitinol.
- Polycaprolactone (polymorph) can be molded by immersion in hot water.

Chromogenic: A color change in response to electrical, optical, or thermal stimuli.

- Electrochromic materials, which change their color or opacity with applied voltage (e.g., liquid crystal displays).
- Thermochromic materials change in color depending on their temperature.
- Photochromic materials change color in response to light (e.g., transition sunglasses that darken when exposed to bright sunlight).
- Halochromic materials are commonly used materials that change their color as a result of changing acidity. One suggested application is for paints that can change color to indicate corrosion in the metal underneath them.

Stimuli Responsive: Responsive to environmental stimuli.

- Temperature-responsive polymers are materials that changes in response to temperature.
- pH-sensitive polymers are materials that change in volume when the pH of the surrounding medium changes.
- Chemoresponsive materials change their physical properties such as optical properties, size, volume, shape, electrical conductivity, and hydrophobicity/hydrophilicity with the exposure of external chemical or biological compounds.
- Smart inorganic polymers showing tunable and responsive properties.

Energy Conversion: Can transform stimuli into electrical current.

- Photovoltaic materials or optoelectronics convert light to electrical current.
- Thermoelectric materials are used to build devices that convert temperature differences into electricity and vice versa.

Optically Driven Mechanical Responsive: A change in mechanical properties in response to optical stimuli.

- Photomechanical materials change shape under exposure to light.

Self Repairing: The ability to repair mild damage with little to no external intervention.

- Self-healing materials have the intrinsic ability to repair damage due to normal usage, thus expanding the material's lifetime.

== See also ==
- Smart polymer
- Programmable matter
- Sensors
- Actuators
- Artificial muscles
- Thermally induced shape-memory effect (polymers)
- Covalent adaptable networks / Vitrimers
