= Shape-memory polymer =

Materials that can retain several shapes

Shape-memory polymers (SMPs) are polymeric smart materials that have the ability to return from a deformed state (temporary shape) to their original (permanent) shape when induced by an external stimulus (trigger), such as temperature change.

IUPAC definition

Polymer that, after heating and being subjected to a plastic deformation, resumes its original shape when heated above its glass-transition or melting temperature

Note:

- Crystalline trans-polyisoprene is an example of a shape-memory polymer.

== Properties of shape-memory polymers ==
SMPs can retain two or sometimes three shapes, and the transition between those is often induced by temperature change. In addition to temperature change, the shape change of SMPs can also be triggered by an electric or magnetic field, light or solution. Like polymers in general, SMPs cover a wide range of properties from stable to biodegradable, from soft to hard, and from elastic to rigid, depending on the structural units that constitute the SMP. SMPs include thermoplastic and thermoset (covalently cross-linked) polymeric materials. SMPs are known to be able to store up to three different shapes in memory. SMPs have demonstrated recoverable strains of above 800%.

Two important quantities that are used to describe shape-memory effects are the strain recovery rate (R_{r}) and strain fixity rate (R_{f}). The strain recovery rate describes the ability of the material to memorize its permanent shape, while the strain fixity rate describes the ability of switching segments to fix the mechanical deformation.

Result of the cyclic thermomechanical test

$$R_r(N) = \frac{\varepsilon_m - \varepsilon_p(N)}{\varepsilon_m - \varepsilon_p(N-1)}$$
$$R_f(N) = \frac{\varepsilon_u(N)}{\varepsilon_m}$$

where $N$ is the cycle number, $\varepsilon_m$ is the maximum strain imposed on the material, and $\varepsilon_p(N)$ and $\varepsilon_p(N-1)$ are the strains of the sample in two successive cycles in the stress-free state before yield stress is applied.

Shape-memory effect can be described briefly as the following mathematical model:

$$R_f(N) = 1 - \frac{E_f}{E_g}$$
$$R_r(N) = 1 - \frac{f_{IR}}{f_\alpha (1 - E_f/E_g)}$$

where $E_g$ is the glassy modulus, $E_r$ is the rubbery modulus, $f_{IR}$ is viscous flow strain and $f_{\alpha}$ is strain for $t >> t_r$.

=== Triple-shape memory ===
While most traditional shape-memory polymers can only hold a permanent and temporary shape, recent technological advances have allowed the introduction of triple-shape-memory materials. Much as a traditional double-shape-memory polymer will change from a temporary shape back to a permanent shape at a particular temperature, triple-shape-memory polymers will switch from one temporary shape to another at the first transition temperature, and then back to the permanent shape at another, higher activation temperature. This is usually achieved by combining two double-shape-memory polymers with different glass transition temperatures or when heating a programmed shape-memory polymer first above the glass transition temperature and then above the melting transition temperature of the switching segment.

== Description of the thermally induced shape-memory effect ==
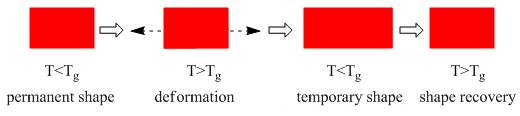
A schematic representation of the shape-memory effect

Polymers exhibiting a shape-memory effect have both a visible, current (temporary) form and a stored (permanent) form. Once the latter has been manufactured by conventional methods, the material is changed into another, temporary form by processing through heating, deformation, and finally, cooling. The polymer maintains this temporary shape until the shape change into the permanent form is activated by a predetermined external stimulus. The secret behind these materials lies in their molecular network structure, which contains at least two separate phases. The phase showing the highest thermal transition, T_{perm}, is the temperature that must be exceeded to establish the physical crosslinks responsible for the permanent shape. The switching segments, on the other hand, are the segments with the ability to soften past a certain transition temperature (T_{trans}) and are responsible for the temporary shape. In some cases this is the glass transition temperature (T_{g}) and others the melting temperature (T_{m}). Exceeding T_{trans} (while remaining below T_{perm}) activates the switching by softening these switching segments and thereby allowing the material to resume its original (permanent) form. Below T_{trans}, flexibility of the segments is at least partly limited. If T_{m} is chosen for programming the SMP, strain-induced crystallization of the switching segment can be initiated when it is stretched above T_{m} and subsequently cooled below T_{m}. These crystallites form covalent netpoints which prevent the polymer from reforming its usual coiled structure. The hard to soft segment ratio is often between 5/95 and 95/5, but ideally this ratio is between 20/80 and 80/20. The shape-memory polymers are effectively viscoelastic and many models and analysis methods exist.

=== Thermodynamics of the shape-memory effect ===
In the amorphous state, polymer chains assume a completely random distribution within the matrix. W represents the probability of a strongly coiled conformation, which is the conformation with maximum entropy, and is the most likely state for an amorphous linear polymer chain. This relationship is represented mathematically by Boltzmann's entropy formula S = k ln W, where S is the entropy and k is the Boltzmann constant.

In the transition from the glassy state to a rubber-elastic state by thermal activation, the rotations around segment bonds become increasingly unimpeded. This allows chains to assume other possibly, energetically equivalent conformations with a small amount of disentangling. As a result, the majority of SMPs will form compact, random coils because this conformation is entropically favored over a stretched conformation.

Polymers in this elastic state with number average molecular weight greater than 20,000 stretch in the direction of an applied external force. If the force is applied for a short time, the entanglement of polymer chains with their neighbors will prevent large movement of the chain and the sample recovers its original conformation upon removal of the force. If the force is applied for a longer period of time, however, a relaxation process takes place whereby a plastic, irreversible deformation of the sample takes place due to the slipping and disentangling of the polymer chains.

To prevent the slipping and flow of polymer chains, cross-linking can be used, both chemical and physical.

=== Physically crosslinked SMPs ===
==== Linear block copolymers ====
Representative shape-memory polymers in this category are polyurethanes, polyurethanes with ionic or mesogenic components made by prepolymer method. Other block copolymers also show the shape-memory effect, such as, block copolymer of polyethylene terephthalate (PET) and polyethyleneoxide (PEO), block copolymers containing polystyrene and poly(1,4-butadiene), and an ABA triblock copolymer made from poly(2-methyl-2-oxazoline) and polytetrahydrofuran.

==== Other thermoplastic polymers ====
A linear, amorphous polynorbornene (Norsorex, developed by CdF Chemie/Nippon Zeon) or organic-inorganic hybrid polymers consisting of polynorbornene units that are partially substituted by polyhedral oligosilsesquioxane (POSS) also have shape-memory effect.

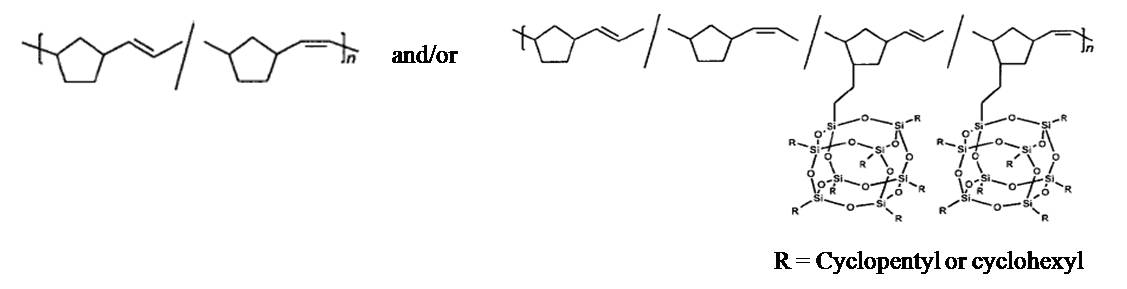

Another example reported in the literature is a copolymer consisting of polycyclooctene (PCOE) and poly(5-norbornene-exo,exo-2,3-dicarboxylic anhydride) (PNBEDCA), which was synthesized through ring-opening metathesis polymerization (ROMP). Then the obtained copolymer P(COE-co-NBEDCA) was readily modified by grafting reaction of NBEDCA units with polyhedral oligomeric silsesquioxanes (POSS) to afford a functionalized copolymer P(COE-co-NBEDCA-g-POSS). It exhibits shape-memory effect.

=== Chemically crosslinked SMPs ===
The main limitation of physically crosslinked polymers for the shape-memory application is irreversible deformation during memory programming due to the creep. The network polymer can be synthesized by either polymerization with multifunctional (3 or more) crosslinker or by subsequent crosslinking of a linear or branched polymer. They form insoluble materials which swell in certain solvents.

==== Crosslinked polyurethane ====
This material can be made by using excess diisocyanate or by using a crosslinker such as glycerin, trimethylol propane. Introduction of covalent crosslinking improves in creep, increase in recovery temperature and recovery window.

==== PEO based crosslinked SMPs ====
The PEO-PET block copolymers can be crosslinked by using maleic anhydride, glycerin or dimethyl 5-isophthalates as a crosslinking agent. The addition of 1.5 wt% maleic anhydride increased in shape recovery from 35% to 65% and tensile strength from 3 to 5 MPa.

Hard phase	Crosslinker	T_{r} (°C)	R_{f}(5)(%)	R_{f}(5)(%)
PET	Glycerol/dimethyl 5-sulfoisophthalate	11–30	90–95	60–70
PET	Maleic anhydride	8–13	91–93	60
AA/MAA copolymer	N,N'-methylene-bis-acrylamide	90		99
MAA/N-vinyl-2-pyrrolidone	Ethyleneglycol dimethacrylate	90		99
PMMA/N-vinyl-2-pyrrolidone	Ethyleneglycol dimethacrylate	45, 100		99

==== Thermoplastic shape-memory ====
While shape-memory effects are traditionally limited to thermosetting plastics, some thermoplastic polymers, most notably PEEK, can be used as well.

== Light-induced SMPs ==
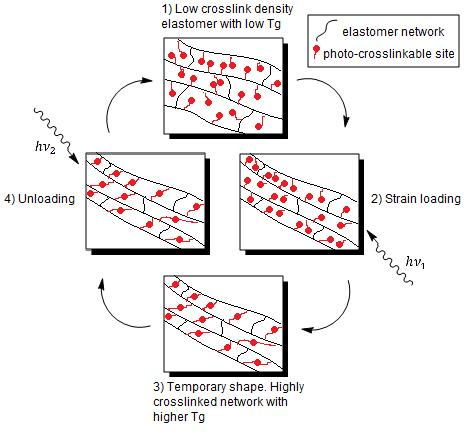
A schematic representation of reversible LASMP crosslinking

Light-activated shape-memory polymers (LASMP) use processes of photo-crosslinking and photo-cleaving to change T_{g}. Photo-crosslinking is achieved by using one wavelength of light, while a second wavelength of light reversibly cleaves the photo-crosslinked bonds. The effect achieved is that the material may be reversibly switched between an elastomer and a rigid polymer. Light does not change the temperature, only the cross-linking density within the material. For example, it has been reported that polymers containing cinnamic groups can be fixed into predetermined shapes by UV light illumination (> 260 nm) and then recover their original shape when exposed to UV light of a different wavelength (< 260 nm). Examples of photoresponsive switches include cinnamic acid and cinnamylidene acetic acid.

== Electro-active SMPs ==
The use of electricity to activate the shape-memory effect of polymers is desirable for applications where it would not be possible to use heat and is another active area of research. Some current efforts use conducting SMP composites with carbon nanotubes, short carbon fibers (SCFs), carbon black, or metallic Ni powder. These conducting SMPs are produced by chemically surface-modifying multi-walled carbon nanotubes (MWNTs) in a mixed solvent of nitric acid and sulfuric acid, with the purpose of improving the interfacial bonding between the polymers and the conductive fillers. The shape-memory effect in these types of SMPs have been shown to be dependent on the filler content and the degree of surface modification of the MWNTs, with the surface modified versions exhibiting good energy conversion efficiency and improved mechanical properties.

Another technique being investigated involves the use of surface-modified super-paramagnetic nanoparticles. When introduced into the polymer matrix, remote actuation of shape transitions is possible. An example of this involves the use of oligo (e-caprolactone)dimethacrylate/butyl acrylate composite with between 2 and 12% magnetite nanoparticles. Nickel and hybrid fibers have also been used with some degree of success.

== Humidity-driven SMPs ==
Actuation of SMPs is most commonly achieved by thermal activation. The actuation could also typically be achieved through immersion at high or low temperatures.

In some cases, humidity is used to reduce the glass transition temperature (Tg) of the material, thereby lowering the temperature required for actuation. More recently, studies have shown that SMPs can exhibit shape-memory behavior entirely at room temperature, without requiring changes in thermal conditions for programming or actuation.

The mechanism of humidity-driven actuation has been associated with the creation of hydrogen bonds within the polymeric network, as observed by Fourier-transform infrared spectroscopy (FTIR). Hydrogen bonds are believed to increase the flexibility of polymer chains, allowing for motion of the shape-memory structure. In particular, chitosan-based composites have demonstrated reversible actuation at ambient humidity, highlighting their potential for sustainable and low-energy applications in smart materials.

== Shape-memory polymers vs. shape-memory alloys ==
A summary of the major differences between SMPs and SMAs
	SMPs	SMAs
Density (g/cm^{3})	0.9–1.2	6–8
Extent of deformation	up to 800%	<8%
Required stress for deformation (MPa)	1–3	50–200
Stress generated upon recovery (MPa)	1–3	150–300
Transition temperatures (°C)	−10..100	−10..100
Recovery speed	1s – minutes	<1s
Processing conditions	<200 °C low pressure	>1000 °C high pressure
Costs	<$10/lb	~$250/lb

Shape-memory polymers differ from shape memory alloys (SMAs) by their glass transition or melting transition from a hard to a soft phase which is responsible for the shape-memory effect. In shape-memory alloys martensitic/austenitic transitions are responsible for the shape-memory effect. There are numerous advantages that make SMPs more attractive than shape memory alloys. They have a high capacity for elastic deformation (up to 200% in most cases), much lower cost, lower density, a broad range of application temperatures which can be tailored, easy processing, potential biocompatibility and biodegradability, and probably exhibit superior mechanical properties to those of SMAs.

== Applications ==
=== Industrial applications ===
One of the first conceived industrial applications was in robotics where shape-memory (SM) foams were used to provide initial soft pretension in gripping. These SM foams could be subsequently hardened by cooling, making a shape adaptive grip. Since this time, the materials have seen widespread usage in, for example, the building industry (foam which expands with warmth to seal window frames), sports wear (helmets, judo and karate suits) and in some cases with thermochromic additives for ease of thermal profile observation. Polyurethane SMPs are also applied as an autochoke element for engines.

=== Application in photonics ===
One field in which SMPs are having a significant impact is photonics. Due to the shape changing capability, SMPs enable the production of functional and responsive photonic gratings. By using modern soft lithography techniques such as replica molding, it is possible to imprint periodic nanostructures, with sizes of the order of magnitude of visible light, onto the surface of shape memory polymeric blocks. As a result of the refractive index periodicity, these systems diffract light. By taking advantage of the polymer's shape memory effect, it is possible to reprogram the lattice parameter of the structure and consequently tune its diffractive behavior. Another application of SMPs in photonics is shape changing random lasers. By doping SMPs with highly scattering particles such as titania it is possible to tune the light transport properties of the composite. Additionally, optical gain may be introduced by adding a molecular dye to the material. By configuring both the amount of scatters and of the organic dye, a light amplification regime may be observed when the composites are optically pumped. Shape memory polymers have also been used in conjunction with nanocellulose to fabricate composites exhibiting both chiroptical properties and thermo-activated shape memory effect.

=== Medical applications ===
Most medical applications of SMP have yet to be developed, but devices with SMP are now beginning to hit the market. Recently, this technology has expanded to applications in orthopedic surgery. Additionally, SMPs are now being used in various ophthalmic devices including punctal plugs, glaucoma shunts and intraocular lenses.

=== Potential medical applications ===
SMPs are smart materials with potential applications as, e.g., intravenous cannula, self-adjusting orthodontic wires and selectively pliable tools for small scale surgical procedures where currently metal-based shape-memory alloys such as Nitinol are widely used. Another application of SMP in the medical field could be its use in implants: for example minimally invasive, through small incisions or natural orifices, implantation of a device in its small temporary shape. Shape-memory technologies have shown great promise for cardiovascular stents, since they allow a small stent to be inserted along a vein or artery and then expanded to prop it open. After activating the shape memory by temperature increase or mechanical stress, it would assume its permanent shape. Certain classes of shape-memory polymers possess an additional property: biodegradability. This offers the option to develop temporary implants. In the case of biodegradable polymers, after the implant has fulfilled its intended use, e.g. healing/tissue regeneration has occurred, the material degrades into substances which can be eliminated by the body. Thus full functionality would be restored without the necessity for a second surgery to remove the implant. Examples of this development are vascular stents and surgical sutures. When used in surgical sutures, the shape-memory property of SMPs enables wound closure with self-adjusting optimal tension, which avoids tissue damage due to overtightened sutures and does support healing and regeneration. SMPs have also potential for use as compression garments and hands-free door openers, whereby the latter can be produced via so-called 4D printing.

=== Potential industrial applications ===
Further potential applications include self-repairing structural components, such as e.g. automobile fenders in which dents are repaired by application of temperature. After an undesired deformation, such as a dent in the fender, these materials "remember" their original shape. Heating them activates their "memory". In the example of the dent, the fender could be repaired with a heat source, such as a hair-dryer. The impact results in a temporary form, which changes back to the original form upon heating—in effect, the plastic repairs itself. SMPs may also be useful in the production of aircraft which would morph during flight. Currently, the Defense Advanced Research Projects Agency DARPA is testing wings which would change shape by 150%.

The realization of a better control over the switching behavior of polymers is seen as key factor to implement new technical concepts. For instance, an accurate setting of the onset temperature of shape recovering can be exploited to tune the release temperature of information stored in a shape memory polymer. This may pave the way for the monitoring of temperature abuses of food or pharmaceuticals.

Recently, a new manufacturing process, mnemosynation, was developed at Georgia Tech to enable mass production of crosslinked SMP devices, which would otherwise be cost-prohibitive using traditional thermoset polymerization techniques. Mnemosynation was named for the Greek goddess of memory, Mnemosyne, and is the controlled imparting of memory on an amorphous thermoplastic materials utilizing radiation-induced covalent crosslinking, much like vulcanization imparts recoverable elastomeric behavior on rubbers using sulfur crosslinks. Mnemosynation combines advances in ionizing radiation and tuning the mechanical properties of SMPs to enable traditional plastics processing (extrusion, blow molding, injection molding, resin transfer molding, etc.) and allows thermoset SMPs in complex geometries. The customizable mechanical properties of traditional SMPs are achievable with high throughput plastics processing techniques to enable mass producible plastic products with thermosetting shape-memory properties: low residual strains, tunable recoverable force and adjustable glass transition temperatures.

=== Brand protection and anti-counterfeiting ===
Shape memory polymers may serve as technology platform for a safe way of information storage and release. Overt anti-counterfeiting labels have been constructed that display a visual symbol or code when exposed to specific chemicals. Multifunctional labels may even make counterfeiting increasingly difficult. Shape memory polymers have already been made into shape memory film by extruder machine, with covert and overt 3D embossed pattern internally, and 3D pattern will be released to be embossed or disappeared in just seconds irreversibly as soon as it is heated; Shape memory film can be used as label substrates or face stock for anti-counterfeiting, brand protection, tamper-evident seals, anti-pilferage seals, etc.

=== Multifunctional composites ===
Using shape memory polymers as matrices, multifunctional composite materials can be produced. Such composites can have temperature dependant shape morphing (i.e. shape memory) characteristics. This phenomenon allows these composites to be potentially used to create deployable structures such as booms, hinges, wings etc. While using SMPs can help produce one-way shape morphing structures, it has been reported that using SMPs in combination with shape memory alloys allows creation of more complex shape memory composites that is capable of two-way shape memory deformation.

== See also ==
- Memory foam
- Smart material
- Shape-memory alloy
