= Electroactive polymer =

Polymer responsive to electric fields

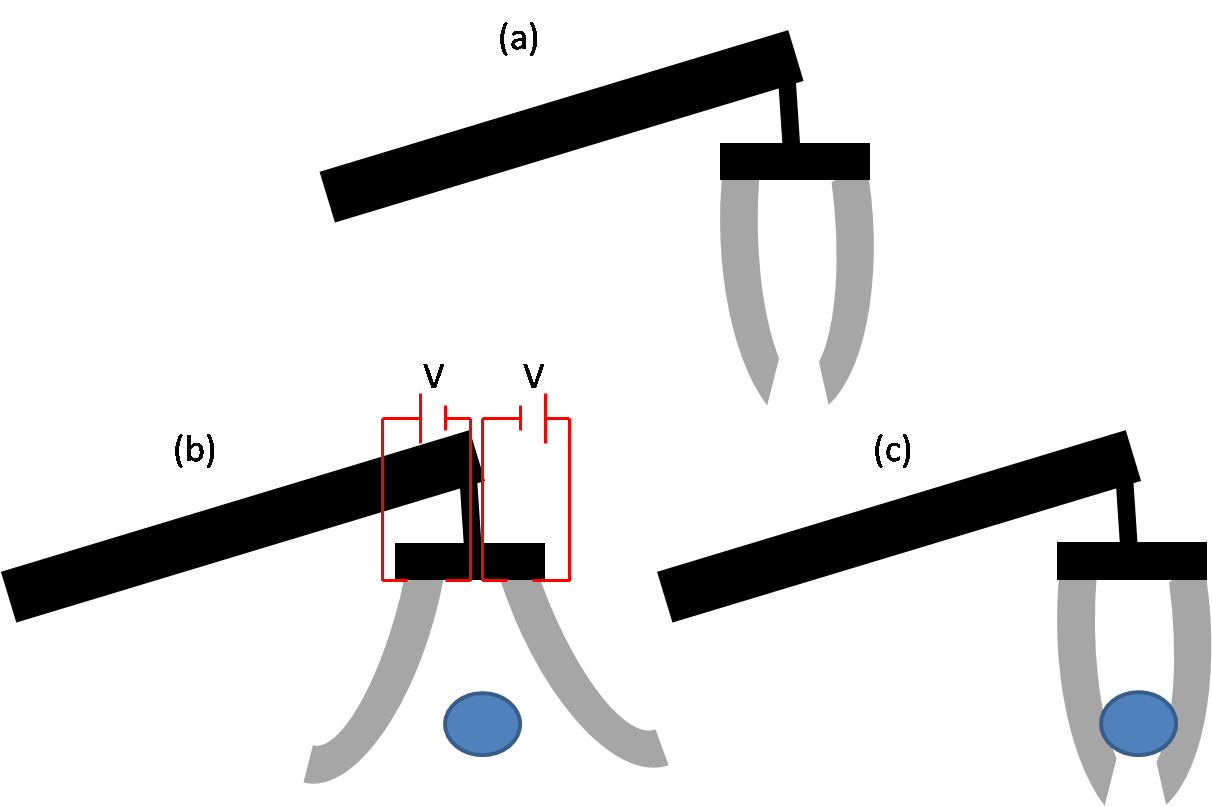
1. An EAP gripping device at rest; 2. A voltage is applied and the EAP fingers deform in order to release the ball; 3. The voltage is removed and the EAP fingers return to their original shape and grip the ball

An electroactive polymer (EAP) is a polymer that exhibits a change in size or shape when stimulated by an electric field. The most common applications of this type of material are in actuators and sensors. A typical characteristic property of an EAP is that they will undergo a large amount of deformation while sustaining large forces.

The majority of historic actuators are made of ceramic piezoelectric materials. While these materials are able to withstand large forces, they commonly will only deform a fraction of a percent. In the late 1990s, it has been demonstrated that some EAPs can exhibit up to a 380% strain, which is much more than any ceramic actuator. One of the most common applications for EAPs is in the field of robotics in the development of artificial muscles; thus, an electroactive polymer is often referred to as an artificial muscle.

== History ==
The field of EAPs emerged back in 1880, when Wilhelm Röntgen designed an experiment in which he tested the effect of an electrostatic field on the mechanical properties of a stripe of natural rubber. The rubber stripe was fixed at one end and was attached to a mass at the other. Electric charges were then sprayed onto the rubber, and it was observed that the length changed. It was in 1925 that the first piezoelectric polymer was discovered (Electret). Electret was formed by combining carnauba wax, rosin and beeswax, and then cooling the solution while it is subject to an applied DC electrical bias. The mixture would then solidify into a polymeric material that exhibited a piezoelectric effect.

Polymers that respond to environmental conditions, other than an applied electric current, have also been a large part of this area of study. In 1949 Katchalsky et al. demonstrated that when collagen filaments are dipped in acid or alkali solutions, they would respond with a change in volume. The collagen filaments were found to expand in an acidic solution and contract in an alkali solution. Although other stimuli (such as pH) have been investigated, due to its ease and practicality most research has been devoted to developing polymers that respond to electrical stimuli in order to mimic biological systems.

The next major breakthrough in EAPs took place in the late 1960s. In 1969 Kawai demonstrated that polyvinylidene fluoride (PVDF) exhibits a large piezoelectric effect. This sparked research interest in developing other polymers that would show a similar effect. In 1977 the first electrically conducting polymers were discovered by Hideki Shirakawa et al. Shirakawa, along with Alan MacDiarmid and Alan Heeger, demonstrated that polyacetylene was electrically conductive, and that by doping it with iodine vapor, they could enhance its conductivity by 8 orders of magnitude. Thus the conductance was close to that of a metal. By the late 1980s a number of other polymers had been shown to exhibit a piezoelectric effect or were demonstrated to be conductive.

In the early 1990s, ionic polymer-metal composites (IPMCs) were developed and shown to exhibit electroactive properties far superior to previous EAPs. The major advantage of IPMCs was that they were able to show activation (deformation) at voltages as low as 1 or 2 volts. This is orders of magnitude less than any previous EAP. Not only was the activation energy for these materials much lower, but they could also undergo much larger deformations. IPMCs were shown to exhibit anywhere up to 380% strain, orders of magnitude larger than previously developed EAPs.

In 1999, Yoseph Bar-Cohen proposed the Armwrestling Match of EAP Robotic Arm Against Human Challenge. This was a challenge in which research groups around the world competed to design a robotic arm consisting of EAP muscles that could defeat a human in an arm wrestling match. The first challenge was held at the Electroactive Polymer Actuators and Devices Conference in 2005. Another major milestone of the field is that the first commercially developed device including EAPs as an artificial muscle was produced in 2002 by Eamex in Japan. This device was a fish that was able to swim on its own, moving its tail using an EAP muscle. But the progress in practical development has not been satisfactory.

DARPA-funded research in the 1990s at SRI International and led by Ron Pelrine developed an electroactive polymer using silicone and acrylic polymers; the technology was spun off into the company Artificial Muscle in 2003, with industrial production beginning in 2008. In 2010, Artificial Muscle became a subsidiary of Bayer MaterialScience.

== Types ==
EAPs can have several configurations, but are generally divided in two principal classes: Dielectric and Ionic.

=== Dielectric ===
Dielectric EAPs are materials in which actuation is caused by electrostatic forces between two electrodes which squeeze the polymer. Dielectric elastomers are capable of very high strains and are fundamentally a capacitor that changes its capacitance when a voltage is applied by allowing the polymer to compress in thickness and expand in area due to the electric field. This type of EAP typically requires a large actuation voltage to produce high electric fields (hundreds to thousands of volts), but very low electrical power consumption. Dielectric EAPs require no power to keep the actuator at a given position. Examples are electrostrictive polymers and dielectric elastomers.

==== Ferroelectric polymers ====
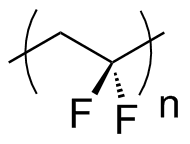
Structure of poly(vinylidene fluoride)

Ferroelectric polymers are a group of crystalline polar polymers that are also ferroelectric, meaning that they maintain a permanent electric polarization that can be reversed, or switched, in an external electric field. Ferroelectric polymers, such as polyvinylidene fluoride (PVDF), are used in acoustic transducers and electromechanical actuators because of their inherent piezoelectric response, and as heat sensors because of their inherent pyroelectric response.

==== Electrostrictive graft polymers ====
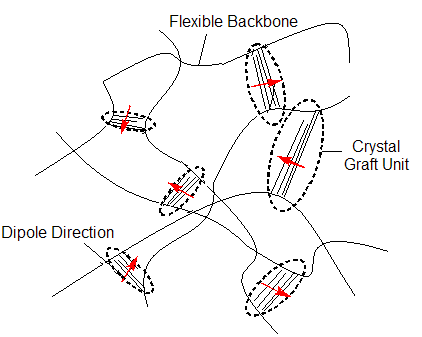
An electrostrictive graft polymer

Electrostrictive graft polymers consist of flexible backbone chains with branching side chains. The side chains on neighboring backbone polymers cross link and form crystal units. The backbone and side chain crystal units can then form polarized monomers, which contain atoms with partial charges and generate dipole moments.

When an electrical field is applied, a force is applied to each partial charge, which causes rotation of the whole polymer unit. This rotation causes electrostrictive strain and deformation of the polymer.

==== Liquid crystalline polymers ====
Main-chain liquid crystalline polymers have mesogenic groups linked to each other by a flexible spacer. The mesogens within a backbone form the mesophase structure, causing the polymer itself to adopt a conformation compatible with the structure of the mesophase. The direct coupling of the liquid crystalline order with the polymer conformation has given main-chain liquid crystalline elastomers a large amount of interest. The synthesis of highly oriented elastomers leads to a large strain thermal actuation along the polymer chain direction, with temperature variation resulting in unique mechanical properties and potential applications as mechanical actuators.

=== Ionic ===
Ionic EAPs are polymers in which actuation is caused by the displacement of ions inside the polymer. Only a few volts are needed for actuation, but the ionic flow implies that higher electrical power is needed for actuation, and energy is needed to keep the actuator at a given position.

Examples of ionic EAPs are conductive polymers, ionic polymer-metal composites (IPMCs), and responsive gels. Yet another example is a Bucky gel actuator, which is a polymer-supported layer of polyelectrolyte material consisting of an ionic liquid sandwiched between two electrode layers, which is then a gel of ionic liquid containing single-wall carbon nanotubes. The name comes from the similarity of the gel to the paper that can be made by filtering carbon nanotubes, the so-called buckypaper.

==== Electrorheological fluid ====
Electrorheological fluids change viscosity when an electric field is applied. The fluid is a suspension of polymers in a low dielectric-constant liquid. With the application of a large electric field the viscosity of the suspension increases. Potential applications of these fluids include shock absorbers, engine mounts and acoustic dampers.

==== Ionic polymer-metal composite ====
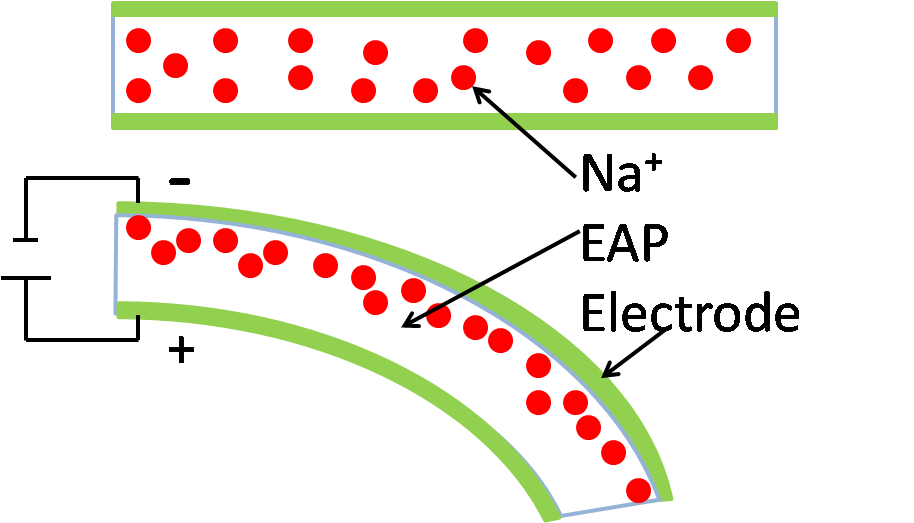
The cations in the ionic polymer-metal composite are randomly oriented in the absence of an electric field. When a field is applied, the cations gather to the side of the polymer in contact with the anode, causing the polymer to bend.

Ionic polymer-metal composites consist of a thin ionomeric membrane with noble metal electrodes plated on its surface. It also has cations to balance the charge of the anions fixed to the polymer backbone. They are very active actuators that show very high deformation at low applied voltage and show low impedance. Ionic polymer-metal composites work through electrostatic attraction between the cationic counter ions and the cathode of the applied electric field. These types of polymers show the greatest promise for bio-mimetic uses as collagen fibers are essentially composed of natural charged ionic polymers. Nafion and Flemion are commonly used ionic polymer metal composites.

==== Stimuli-responsive gels ====
Stimuli-responsive gels (hydrogels, when the swelling agent is an aqueous solution) are a special kind of swellable polymer networks with volume phase transition behaviour. These materials change reversibly their volume, optical, mechanical and other properties by very small alterations of certain physical (e.g. electric field, light, temperature) or chemical (concentrations) stimuli. The volume change of these materials occurs by swelling/shrinking and is diffusion-based. Gels provide the biggest change in volume of solid-state materials. Combined with an excellent compatibility with micro-fabrication technologies, especially stimuli-responsive hydrogels are of strong increasing interest for microsystems with sensors and actuators. Current fields of research and application are chemical sensor systems, microfluidics and multimodal imaging systems.

== Comparison of dielectric and ionic EAPs ==
Dielectric polymers are able to hold their induced displacement while activated under a DC voltage. This allows dielectric polymers to be considered for robotic applications. These types of materials also have high mechanical energy density and can be operated in air without a major decrease in performance. However, dielectric polymers require very high activation fields (>10 V/μm) that are close to the breakdown level.

The activation of ionic polymers, on the other hand, requires only 1-2 volts. They however need to maintain wetness, though some polymers have been developed as self-contained encapsulated activators which allows their use in dry environments. Ionic polymers also have a low electromechanical coupling. They are however ideal for bio-mimetic devices.

== Characterization ==
While there are many different ways electroactive polymers can be characterized, only three will be addressed here: stress–strain curve, dynamic mechanical thermal analysis, and dielectric thermal analysis.

=== Stress–strain curve ===
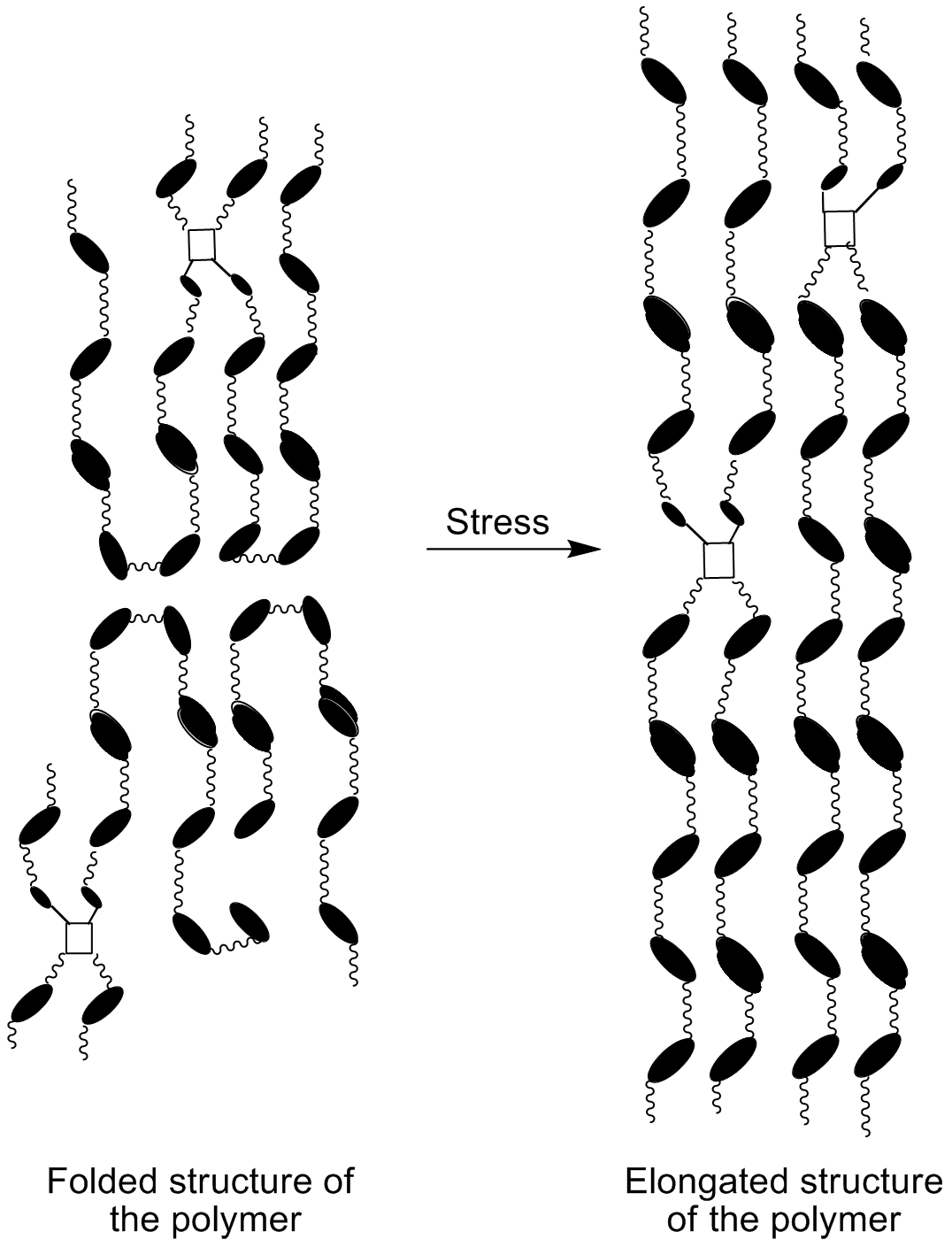
The unstressed polymer spontaneously forms a folded structure. Upon application of a stress, the polymer regains its original length.

Stress strain curves provide information about the polymer's mechanical properties such as the brittleness, elasticity and yield strength of the polymer. This is done by providing a force to the polymer at a uniform rate and measuring the deformation that results. This technique is useful for determining the type of material (brittle, tough, etc.), but it is a destructive technique as the stress is increased until the polymer fractures.

=== Dynamic mechanical thermal analysis (DMTA) ===
Dynamic mechanical analysis is a non destructive technique that is useful in understanding the mechanism of deformation at a molecular level. In DMTA a sinusoidal stress is applied to the polymer, and based on the polymer's deformation, the elastic modulus and damping characteristics are obtained (assuming the polymer is a damped harmonic oscillator). Elastic materials take the mechanical energy of the stress and convert it into potential energy which can later be recovered. An ideal spring will use all the potential energy to regain its original shape (no damping), while a liquid will use all the potential energy to flow, never returning to its original position or shape (high damping). A viscoeleastic polymer will exhibit a combination of both types of behavior.

=== Dielectric thermal analysis (DETA) ===
DETA is similar to DMTA, but instead of an alternating mechanical force an alternating electric field is applied. The applied field can lead to polarization of the sample, and if the polymer contains groups that have permanent dipoles, they will align with the electrical field. The permittivity can be measured from the change in amplitude and resolved into dielectric storage and loss components. The electric displacement field can also be measured by following the current. Once the field is removed, the dipoles will relax back into a random orientation.

== Applications ==
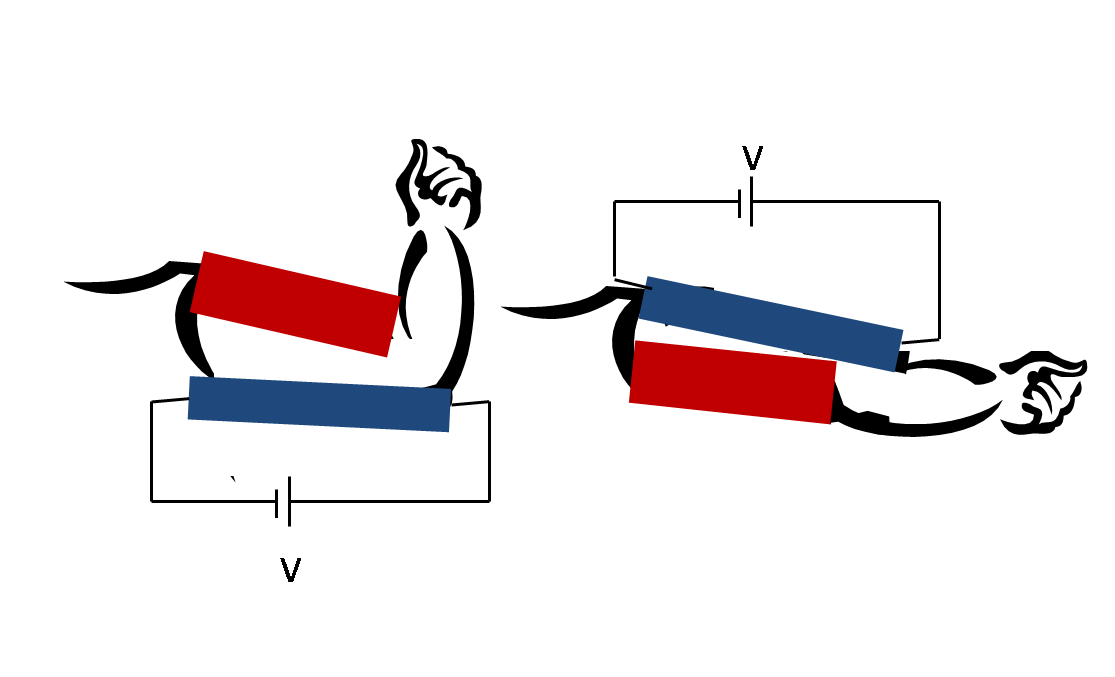
An arm controlled by EAPs. When a voltage is applied (blue muscles) the polymer expands. When the voltage is removed (red muscles) the polymer returns to its original state.

EAP materials can be easily manufactured in various shapes due to the ease of processing many polymeric materials, making them very versatile materials. One potential application for EAPs is integration into microelectromechanical systems (MEMS) to produce smart actuators.

=== Artificial muscles ===
As the most prospective practical research direction, EAPs have been used in artificial muscles. Their ability to emulate the operation of biological muscles with high fracture toughness, large actuation strain and inherent vibration damping draw the attention of scientists in this field. EAPs have even successfully been used to make a type of hand.

=== Tactile displays ===
In recent years, "electro active polymers for refreshable Braille displays" has emerged to aid the visually impaired in fast reading and computer assisted communication. This concept is based on using an EAP actuator configured in an array form. Rows of electrodes on one side of an EAP film and columns on the other activate individual elements in the array. Each element is mounted with a Braille dot and is lowered by applying a voltage across the thickness of the selected element, causing local thickness reduction. Under computer control, dots would be activated to create tactile patterns of highs and lows representing the information to be read.

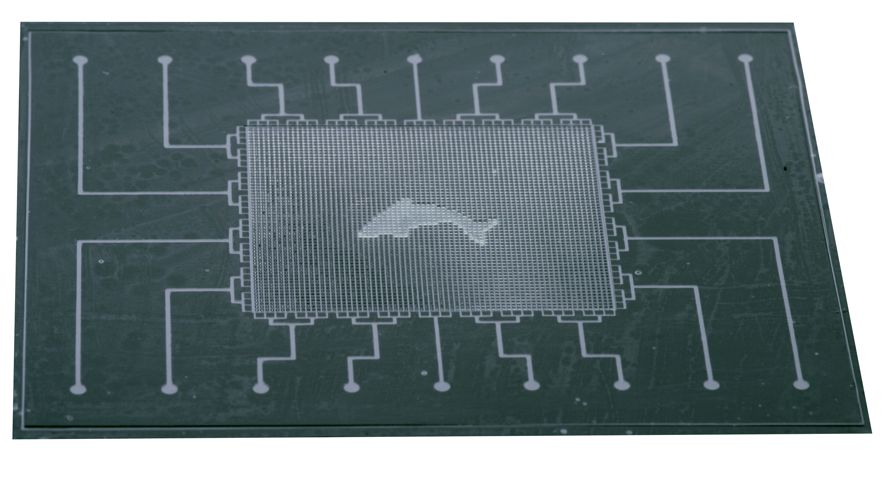
High resolution tactile display consisting of 4,320 (60x72) actuator pixels based on stimuli-responsive hydrogels. The integration density of the device is 297 components per cm². This display gives visual (monochromic) and physical (contours, relief, textures, softness) impressions of a virtual surface.

Visual and tactile impressions of a virtual surface are displayed by a high resolution tactile display, a so-called "artificial skin". These monolithic devices consist of an array of thousands of multimodal modulators (actuator pixels) based on stimuli-responsive hydrogels. Each modulator is able to change individually their transmission, height and softness. Besides their possible use as graphic displays for visually impaired such displays are interesting as free programmable keys of touchpads and consoles.

=== Microfluidics ===
EAP materials have huge potential for microfluidics, e.g. as drug delivery systems, microfluidic devices and lab-on-a-chip. A first microfluidic platform technology reported in the literature is based on stimuli-responsive gels. To avoid the electrolysis of water, hydrogel-based microfluidic devices are mainly based on temperature-responsive polymers with lower critical solution temperature (LCST) characteristics, which are controlled by an electrothermic interface. Two types of micropumps are known, a diffusion micropump and a displacement micropump. Microvalves based on stimuli-responsive hydrogels show some advantageous properties such as particle tolerance, no leakage and outstanding pressure resistance.

Besides these microfluidic standard components, the hydrogel platform provides also chemical sensors and a novel class of microfluidic components, the chemical transistors (also referred as chemostat valves). These devices regulate a liquid flow if a threshold concentration of a certain chemical is reached. Chemical transistors form the basis of microchemomechanical fluidic integrated circuits. "Chemical ICs" process exclusively chemical information, are energy-self-powered, operate automatically and are suitable for large-scale integration.

Another microfluidic platform is based on ionomeric materials. Pumps made from that material could offer low voltage (battery) operation, extremely low noise signature, high system efficiency, and highly accurate control of flow rate.

Another technology that can benefit from the unique properties of EAP actuators is optical membranes. Due to their low modulus, the mechanical impedance of the actuators, they are well-matched to common optical membrane materials. Also, a single EAP actuator is capable of generating displacements that range from micrometers to centimeters. For this reason, these materials can be used for static shape correction and jitter suppression. These actuators could also be used to correct for optical aberrations due to atmospheric interference.

Since these materials exhibit excellent electroactive character, EAP materials show potential in biomimetic-robot research, stress sensors and acoustics field, which will make EAPs become a more attractive study topic in the near future. They have been used for various actuators such as face muscles and arm muscles in humanoid robots.

== Future directions ==
The field of EAPs is far from mature, which leaves several issues that still need to be worked on. The performance and long-term stability of the EAP should be improved by designing a water impermeable surface. This will prevent the evaporation of water contained in the EAP, and also reduce the potential loss of the positive counter ions when the EAP is operating submerged in an aqueous environment. Improved surface conductivity should be explored using methods to produce a defect-free conductive surface. This could possibly be done using metal vapor deposition or other doping methods. It may also be possible to utilize conductive polymers to form a thick conductive layer. Heat resistant EAP would be desirable to allow operation at higher voltages without damaging the internal structure of the EAP due to the generation of heat in the EAP composite. Development of EAPs in different configurations (e.g., fibers and fiber bundles), would also be beneficial, in order to increase the range of possible modes of motion.

== See also ==
- Pneumatic artificial muscles
- Artificial muscles
