= Artificial muscle =

Materials and devices mimicking natural muscles

Artificial muscles, also known as muscle-like actuators, are materials or devices that mimic natural muscle and can change their stiffness, reversibly contract, expand, or rotate within one component due to an external stimulus (such as voltage, current, pressure or temperature). The three basic actuation responses—contraction, expansion, and rotation—can be combined within a single component to produce other types of motions (e.g. bending, by contracting one side of the material while expanding the other side). Conventional motors and pneumatic linear or rotary actuators do not qualify as artificial muscles, because there is more than one component involved in the actuation.

Owing to their high flexibility, versatility and power-to-weight ratio compared with traditional rigid actuators, artificial muscles have the potential to be a highly disruptive emerging technology. Though currently in limited use, the technology may have wide future applications in industry, medicine, biorobotics, and many other fields.

== Comparison with natural muscles ==
While there is no general theory that allows for actuators to be compared, there are "power criteria" for artificial muscle technologies that allow for specification of new actuator technologies in comparison with natural muscular properties. In summary, the criteria include stress, strain, strain rate, cycle life, and elastic modulus. Some authors have considered other criteria (Huber et al., 1997), such as actuator density and strain resolution. As of 2014, the most powerful artificial muscle fibers in existence can offer a hundredfold increase in power over equivalent lengths of natural muscle fibers.

Researchers measure the speed, energy density, power, and efficiency of artificial muscles; no one type of artificial muscle is the best in all areas.

== Types ==
Artificial muscles can be divided into three major groups based on their actuation mechanism.

=== Electric field actuation ===
Electroactive polymers (EAPs) are polymers that can be actuated through the application of electric fields. Currently, the most prominent EAPs include piezoelectric polymers, dielectric actuators (DEAs), electrostrictive graft elastomers, liquid crystal elastomers (LCE) and ferroelectric polymers. While these EAPs can be made to bend, their low capacities for torque motion currently limit their usefulness as artificial muscles. Moreover, without an accepted standard material for creating EAP devices, commercialization has remained impractical. However, significant progress has been made in EAP technology since the 1990s.

==== Ion-based actuation ====
Ionic EAPs are polymers that can be actuated through the diffusion of ions in an electrolyte solution (in addition to the application of electric fields). Current examples of ionic electroactive polymers include polyelectrode gels, ionomeric polymer metallic composites (IPMC), conductive polymers, pyromellitamide gels, and electrorheological fluids (ERF). In 2011, it was demonstrated that twisted carbon nanotubes could also be actuated by applying an electric field.

=== Pneumatic actuation ===
Pneumatic artificial muscles (PAMs) operate by filling a pneumatic bladder with pressurized air. Upon applying gas pressure to the bladder, isotropic volume expansion occurs, but is confined by braided wires that encircle the bladder, translating the volume expansion to a linear contraction along the axis of the actuator. PAMs can be classified by their operation and design; namely, PAMs feature pneumatic or hydraulic operation, overpressure or underpressure operation, braided/netted or embedded membranes and stretching membranes or rearranging membranes. Among the most commonly used PAMs today is a cylindrically braided muscle known as the McKibben Muscle, which was first developed by J. L. McKibben in the 1950s.

=== Thermal actuation ===
==== Fishing line ====
Artificial muscles constructed from ordinary fishing line and sewing thread can lift 100 times more weight and generate 100 times more power than a human muscle of the same length and weight.

Individual macromolecules are aligned with the fiber in commercially available polymer fibers. By winding them into coils, researchers make artificial muscles that contract at speeds similar to human muscles.

A (untwisted) polymer fiber, such as polyethelene fishing line or nylon sewing thread, unlike most materials, shortens when heated—up to about 4% for a 250 K increase in temperature. By twisting the fiber and winding the twisted fiber into a coil, heating causes the coil to tighten up and shorten by up to 49%. Researchers found another way to wind the coil such that heating causes the coil to lengthen by 69%.

One application of thermally activated artificial muscles is to automatically open and close windows, responding to temperature without using any power.

==== Carbon nanotubes ====
Tiny artificial muscles composed of twisted carbon nanotubes filled with paraffin are 200 times stronger than human muscle.

==== Shape-memory alloys ====
Shape-memory alloys (SMAs), liquid crystalline elastomers, and metallic alloys that can be deformed and then returned to their original shape when exposed to heat, can function as artificial muscles. Thermal actuator-based artificial muscles offer heat resistance, impact resistance, low density, high fatigue strength, and large force generation during shape changes. In 2012, a new class of electric field-activated, electrolyte-free artificial muscles called "twisted yarn actuators" were demonstrated, based on the thermal expansion of a secondary material within the muscle's conductive twisted structure. It has also been demonstrated that a coiled vanadium dioxide ribbon can twist and untwist at a peak torsional speed of 200,000 rpm.

== Control systems ==
The three types of artificial muscles have different constraints that affect the type of control system they require for actuation. Control systems are often designed to meet the specifications of a given experiment, with some experiments calling for the combined use of a variety of different actuators or a hybrid control schema. As such, the following examples should not be treated as an exhaustive list of the variety of control systems that may be employed to actuate a given artificial muscle.

=== EAP Control ===
Electro-Active Polymers (EAPs) offer lower weight, faster response, higher power density and quieter operation when compared to traditional actuators. Both electric and ionic EAPs are primarily actuated using feedback control loops, better known as closed-loop control systems.

=== Pneumatic control ===
Currently there are two types of Pneumatic Artificial Muscles (PAMs). The first type has a single bladder surrounded by a braided sleeve and the second type has a double bladder.

==== Single bladder surrounded by a braided sleeve ====
Pneumatic artificial muscles, while lightweight and inexpensive, pose a particularly difficult control problem as they are both highly nonlinear and have properties, such as temperature, that fluctuate significantly over time. PAMs generally consist of rubber and plastic components. As these parts come into contact with each other during actuation, the PAM's temperature increases, ultimately leading to permanent changes in the structure of the artificial muscle over time. This problem has led to a variety of experimental approaches. In summary (provided by Ahn et al.), viable experimental control systems include PID control, adaptive control (Lilly, 2003), nonlinear optimal predictive control (Reynolds et al., 2003), variable structure control (Repperger et al., 1998; Medrano-Cerda et al.,1995), gain scheduling (Repperger et al., 1999), and various soft computing approaches including neural network Kohonen training algorithm control (Hesselroth et al.,1994), neural network/nonlinear PID control (Ahn and Thanh, 2005), and neuro-fuzzy/genetic control (Chan et al., 2003; Lilly et al., 2003).

Control problems regarding highly nonlinear systems have generally been addressed through a trial-and-error approach through which "fuzzy models" (Chan et al., 2003) of the system's behavioral capacities could be teased out (from the experimental results of the specific system being tested) by a knowledgeable human expert. However, some research has employed "real data" (Nelles O., 2000) to train up the accuracy of a given fuzzy model while simultaneously avoiding the mathematical complexities of previous models. Ahn et al.'s experiment is simply one example of recent experiments that use modified genetic algorithms (MGAs) to train up fuzzy models using experimental input-output data from a PAM robot arm.

==== Double bladder ====
This actuator consists of an external membrane with an internal flexible membrane dividing the interior of the muscle into two portions. A tendon is secured to the membrane, and exits the muscle through a sleeve so that the tendon can contract into the muscle. A tube allows air into the internal bladder, which then rolls out into the external bladder. A key advantage of this type of pneumatic muscle is that there is no potentially frictive movement of the bladder against an outer sleeve.

=== Thermal control ===
SMA artificial muscles, while lightweight and useful in applications that require large force and displacement, also present specific control challenges; namely, SMA artificial muscles are limited by their hysteretic input-output relationships and bandwidth limitations. As Wen et al. discuss, the SMA phase transformation phenomenon is "hysteretic" in that the resulting output SMA strand is dependent on the history of its heat input. As for bandwidth limitations, the dynamic response of an SMA actuator during hysteretic phase transformations is very slow due to the amount of time required for the heat to transfer to the SMA artificial muscle. Very little research has been conducted regarding SMA control due to assumptions that regard SMA applications as static devices; nevertheless, a variety of control approaches have been tested to address the control problem of hysteretic nonlinearity.

Generally, this problem has required the application of either open-loop compensation or closed-loop feedback control. Regarding open-loop control, the Preisach model has often been used for its simple structure and ability for easy simulation and control (Hughes and Wen, 1995). As for closed-loop control, a passivity-based approach analyzing SMA closed loop stability has been used (Madill and Wen, 1994). Wen et al.'s study provides another example of closed-loop feedback control, demonstrating the stability of closed-loop control in SMA applications through applying a combination of force feedback control and position control on a flexible aluminum beam actuated by an SMA made from Nitinol.

=== Chemical control ===
Chemomechanical polymers containing groups which are either pH-sensitive or serve as selective recognition site for specific chemical compounds can serve as actuators or sensors. The corresponding gels swell or shrink reversibly in response to such chemical signals. A large variety of supramolulecular recognition elements can be introduced into gel-forming polymers, which can bind and use as initiator metal ions, different anions, aminoacids, carbohydrates, etc. Some of these polymers exhibit mechanical response only if two different chemicals or initiators are present, thus performing as logical gates. Such chemomechanical polymers hold promise also for targeted drug delivery. Polymers containing light absorbing elements can serve as photochemically controlled artificial muscles.

=== Applications ===
Artificial muscle technologies have wide potential applications in biomimetic machines, including biorobotics, industrial actuators and powered exoskeletons. EAP-based artificial muscles offer a combination of light weight, low power requirements, resilience and agility for locomotion and manipulation. Future EAP devices will have applications in aerospace, automotive industry, medicine, robotics, articulation mechanisms, entertainment, animation, toys, clothing, haptic and tactile interfaces, noise control, transducers, power generators, and smart structures.

Pneumatic artificial muscles also offer greater flexibility, controllability and lightness compared to conventional pneumatic cylinders. Most PAM applications involve the utilization of McKibben-like muscles. Thermal actuators such as SMAs have various military, medical, safety, and robotic applications, and could furthermore be used to generate energy through mechanical shape changes.

== See also ==
- Artificial cell
- Electronic nose
- Electronic skin
