= Tethered particle motion =

Tethered particle motion (TPM) is a biophysical method that is used for studying various polymers such as DNA and their interaction with other entities such as proteins.

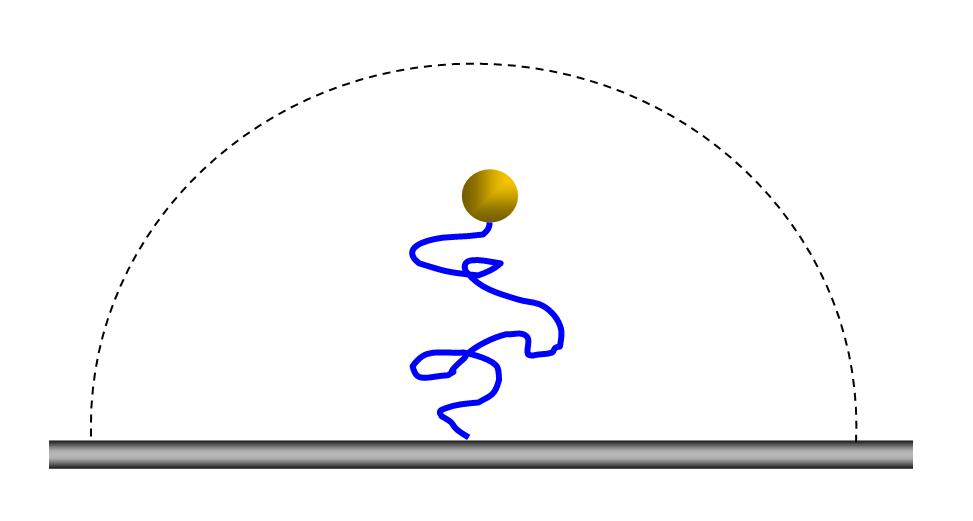
TPM - the bead diffuses in the solution, but because of the tethering, it can move only in restricted volume.

The method allows observers to measure various physical properties on the substances, as well as to measure the properties of biochemical interactions with other substances such as proteins and enzymes. TPM is a single molecule experiment method.

== History ==
TPM was first introduced by Schafer, Gelles, Sheetz and Landick in 1991. In their research, they attached RNA polymerase to the surface, and gold beads were attached to one end of the DNA molecules. In the beginning, the RNA polymerase "captures" the DNA near the gold bead. During the transcription, the DNA "slides" on the RNA polymerase so the distance between the RNA polymerase and the gold bead (the tether length)is increased. Using an optical microscope the area that the bead moves in was detected. The transcription rate was extracted from data.
Since then, a lot of TPM experiments have been done, and the method was improved in many ways such as bead types, biochemistry techniques, imaging (faster cameras, different microscopy methods etc.) data analysis and combination with other single-molecule techniques (e.g. optical or magnetical tweezers).

== Principle of the method ==
One end of a polymer is attached to a small bead (tens to hundreds of nanometer), while the other end is attached to a surface. Both the polymer and the bead stay in an aqueous environment, so the bead moves in Brownian motion. Because of the tether, the motion is restricted. Using an optical microscope and CCD camera, one can track the bead position in a time series. Although the bead is usually smaller than the diffraction limit, so the image is a spot which is larger than the bead itself (point spread function), the center of the spot represents the projection on the X-Y plane of the end of the polymer (end-to-end vector). Analyzing the distribution of the bead position can tell us a lot of information about the polymer.

TPM simulation. The simulation done by MATLAB, using the freely-jointed chain model of polymers. The green points represent the projection of the end-to-end vector of the polymer on the XY plane.

=== Excursion number ===
In order that the motion would be polymer dominated, and not bead dominated, one should notice that the excursion number, N_{R}, will be less than 1:

$N_R\equiv\frac{r}{\sqrt{L\cdot{l_p/3}}}<1$

where $r$ is the bead radius, $L$ is the contour length of the polymer and $l_p$ is the persistence length (50 nm in physiological conditions) of the polymer. (It is possible to work also when $N_R>1$, but it should be treated carefully.)

=== Bead types ===
Metallic beads (usually gold) scatter light with high intensity, so one can use very small beads (~40 nm diameter), and still have a good picture. From the other hand, metallic beads are not the appropriate tool for optical tweezers experiments.

Polystyrene beads scatter light weaker than metallic (in order to get the same intensity as getting from 40 nm gold bead, the polystyrene bead should be ~125 nm!), but it has the advantage that it can be combined with optical tweezers experiments.

The major advantage of fluorospheres is that the excitation wavelength and the emission wavelength are not the same, so dichroic filter can be used to give a cleaner signal. The disadvantage of the fluorospheres is photobleaching.

All of the bead types and diameters (with the biochemistry marker, look at the tether assembly section) are manufactured by commercial companies, and can purchased easily.

== Chip and tether assembly ==
=== Chip assembly ===
A chip can be made of two coverslips. One of them should be drilled to make two hole, allowing the reagents to be injected into the flowcell. The slides should be cleaned to remove dirt. A bath sonicator is a good tool for that, 15 minutes in Isopropanol should do the trick. Next, the a channel should be made. One way of doing so is to cut parafilm in the center, leaving a frame of parafilm that would be used as a spacer between the slides. The slides should be assembled one on the other with the cut parafilm between them. The final step is to heat the chip so that the parafilm will melt and glue the slides together.

=== Tether assembly ===
First, the chip has to be passivated so that the polymer won't stick to the glass, there are plenty of blocking reagents available (BSA, alpha-casein, etc.) and one should find what works best for the specific situation Next, the surface should be coated with an antibody or other reactive molecule (such as anti-digoxigenin) that will bind to an antigen (digoxigenin) at one end of the polymer. After an incubation of about 45min, the excess antibody has to be washed away. After washing the excess antibody, the polymer should be injected into the chip and incubated for about the same time. The polymer had been modified before at the ends. One end has a biotin tail and the other has a digoxigenin tail. After incubation, unbound polymer has to be washed out from the cell. Then, anti-biotin coated beads should be injected to the flowcell and incubate for about 30-45min. Excess beads should be washed out.

== Data analysis ==
Video taken from TPM experiment, using darkfield microscope. The green framed beads are tethered beads, and the red framed are immobilized beads.

=== Tracking ===
As mentioned above, the image doesn't show the bead itself but a larger spot according to its PSF (Point spread function). In addition, the pixel size on the camera may reduce the resolution of the measure. In order to extract the exact bead's position (that corresponds to the end-to-end vector), the center of the spot should be found as accurate as possible. It can be done with good resolution using two different techniques, both based on spot characteristics. The light intensity in the focal plane distributed as airy disk, and has circular symmetry.

A 2-dimensional Gaussian function is a good approximation for airy disk. By fitting this function to the spot one can find the parameters $x_0$ and $y_0$ that are the coordinates of the center of the spot, and of the end-to-end vector.

The second technique is to find the center of intensity, using the definition of center of mass:

$\vec{R}_{cm}=\frac{1}{I_{tot}}\cdot\sum_{k=1}^{N}I_k\cdot\vec{r}_k$

where $\vec{R}_{cm}$ is the center of mass coordinate, $\textstyle I_{tot}$ is the total intensity of the spot, and $\textstyle I_k$ and $\textstyle\vec{r}_k$ are the intensity and coordinate of the k-th pixel. Because of the circular symmetry, the coordinate of the center of intensity is the coordinate of the center of the bead.
Both techniques give us the coordinate of the end-to-end vector in a resolution better than pixel size.

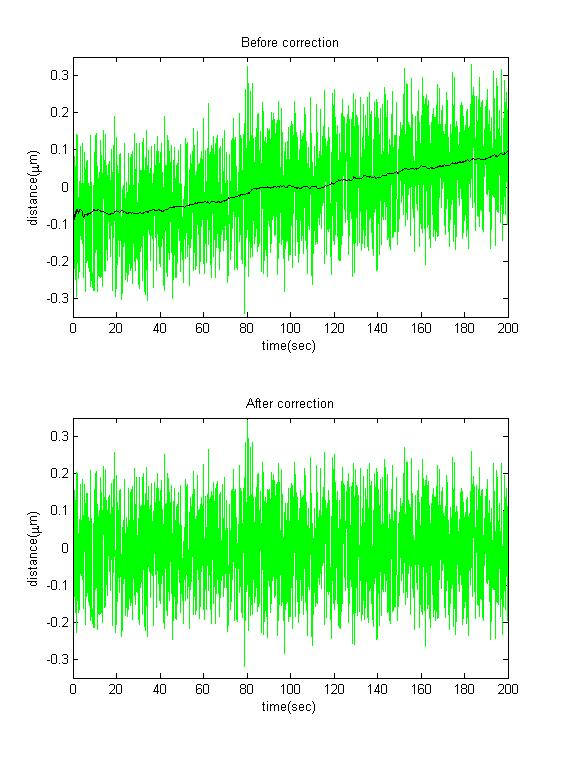
TPM drift: top: The green graph is the data of the TPM experiment, the black curve is smoothing of the data (the drift). bottom: Subtraction of the drift from the data.

=== Drift correction ===
Usually, the whole system drifts during the measuring. There are several methods to correct the drift, generally these can divided into 3 groups:

The Brownian motion frequency is much larger than the drift frequency, so one can use high-pass filter in order to remove the drift. Similar effect can achieve by smoothing the data, and subtraction of the smoothed from the data (see figure).

If few beads are shown in the frame, because every bead moving randomly, averaging over the position of them for every frame should give us the drift (it should subtracted from the data for having clean data).

If an immobilized bead is shown in the frame, we can take its position as a reference, and correct the data by the immobilized bead's position. (Another advantage of looking at immobilized bead, is the fact that the motion of it can tell us about the accuracy of the measure.)
Of course one can use more than one method.

=== Polymer characterization ===
It is common to fit random walk statistics to the end-to-end vector of the polymer. For 1-dimensional we'll get the Normal distribution, and for 2-dimensional the Rayleigh distribution:

$P_{1D}(x)dx=\sqrt{\frac{3}{4{\pi}Ll_p}}\exp{\left(-\frac{3x^2}{4Ll_p}\right)}dx \,\,\,;\,\,\,\,\,\, P_{2D}(R)dR=2{\pi}R\frac{3}{4{\pi}Ll_p}\exp{\left(-\frac{3R^2}{4Ll_p}\right)}dR$

where $L$ is the contour length and $l_p$ is the persistence length.
After collecting the data of time series, one should fitting the histogram of the data to the distribution function (one or two dimensional). If the contour length of the polymer is known, the only fitting parameter is the persistence length.

=== Spring constant ===
Due to entropic force, the polymer acts like Hookian spring. According to Boltzmann distribution, the distribution is proportional to exponent of the ratio between the elastic energy and the thermal energy:

$P(x)\propto \exp{\left(-\frac{\frac{1}{2}kx^2}{K_BT}\right)}$

where $k$ is the spring constant, $K_B$ is Boltzmann constant and $T$ is the temperature. By taking the logarithm of the distribution $P(x)$ and fitting it to a parabola shape, one can get the spring constant of the polymer:

$\displaystyle k=2{\alpha}K_BT$

where $\alpha$ is the coefficient of $x^2$ from the parabola fit.

== Advantage and disadvantage ==
Advantages include a simple setup, cost, the fact that observations are made in the polymer's natural environment (no external forces are used), it is suitable for various microscopy methods (e.g. TIRFM, dark field, differential interference contrast microscopy, etc.), it can be combined and manipulated using other methods, and there are a high variety of applications. Disadvantages include low spatial resolution (~30 nm) and that it fits to in vitro experiments only.

== See also ==
- Single-particle tracking
- Single-molecule experiment
