= Gel =

Highly viscous liquid exhibiting a kind of semi-solid behavior

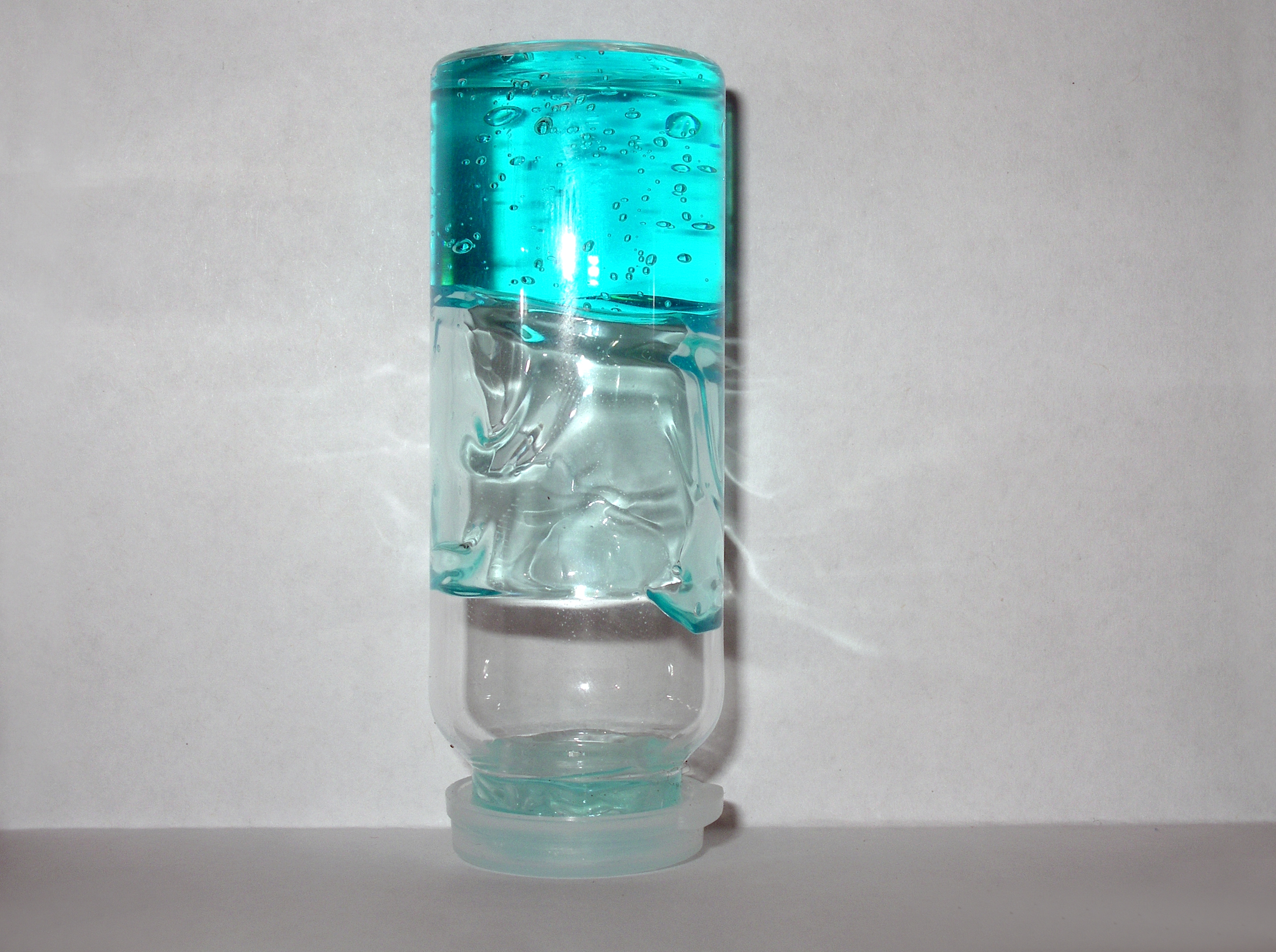
An upturned vial of hair gel

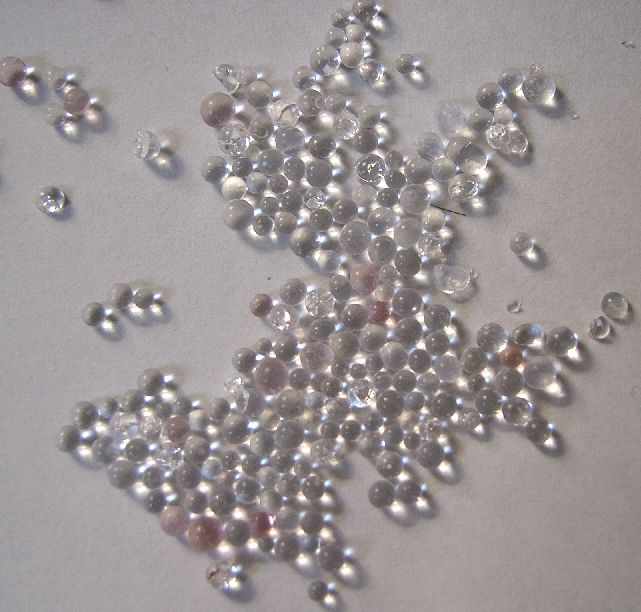
Silica gel

A gel is a semi-solid that can have properties ranging from soft and weak to hard and tough. Gels are defined as a substantially dilute cross-linked system, which exhibits no flow when in the steady state, although the liquid phase may still diffuse through this system.

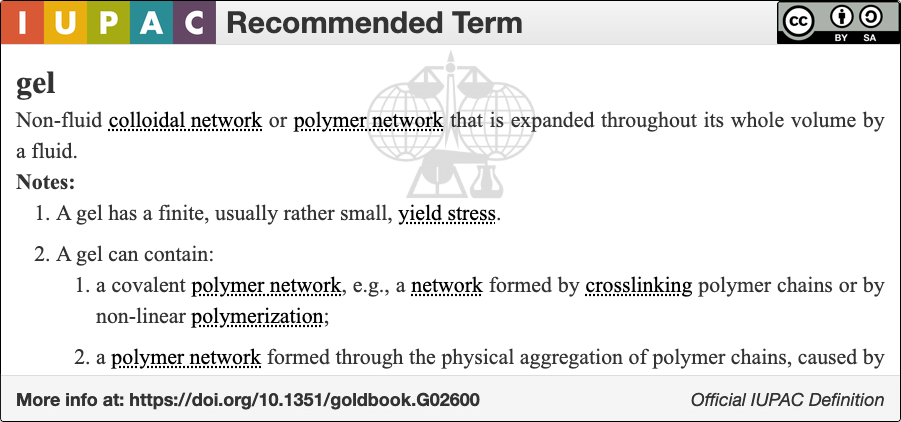
IUPAC definition for a gel

Gels are mostly liquid by mass, yet they behave like solids because of a three-dimensional cross-linked network within the liquid. It is the cross-linking within the fluid that gives a gel its structure (hardness) and contributes to the adhesive stick (tack). In this way, gels are a dispersion of molecules of a liquid within a solid medium. The word gel was coined by 19th-century Scottish chemist Thomas Graham by clipping from gelatine.

The process of forming a gel is called gelation.

== Composition ==
Gels consist of a solid three-dimensional network that spans the volume of a liquid medium and ensnares it through surface tension effects. This internal network structure may result from physical bonds such as polymer chain entanglements (see polymers) (physical gels) or chemical bonds such as disulfide bonds (see thiomers) (chemical gels), as well as crystallites or other junctions that remain intact within the extending fluid. Virtually any fluid can be used as an extender including water (hydrogels), oil, and air (aerogel). Both by weight and volume, gels are mostly fluid in composition and thus exhibit densities similar to those of their constituent liquids. Edible jelly is a common example of a hydrogel and has approximately the density of water.

=== Polyionic polymers ===
Polyionic polymers are polymers with an ionic functional group. The ionic charges prevent the formation of tightly coiled polymer chains. This allows them to contribute more to viscosity in their stretched state, because the stretched-out polymer takes up more space. This is also the reason gel hardens. See polyelectrolyte for more information.

== Types ==
=== Colloidal gels ===
A colloidal gel consists of a percolated network of particles in a fluid medium, providing mechanical properties, in particular the emergence of elastic behaviour. The particles can show attractive interactions through osmotic depletion or through polymeric links.

Colloidal gels have three phases in their lifespan: gelation, aging and collapse. The gel is initially formed by the assembly of particles into a space-spanning network, leading to a phase arrest. In the aging phase, the particles slowly rearrange to form thicker strands, increasing the elasticity of the material. Gels can also be collapsed and separated by external fields such as gravity. Colloidal gels show linear response rheology at low amplitudes. These materials have been explored as candidates for a drug release matrix.

=== Hydrogels ===
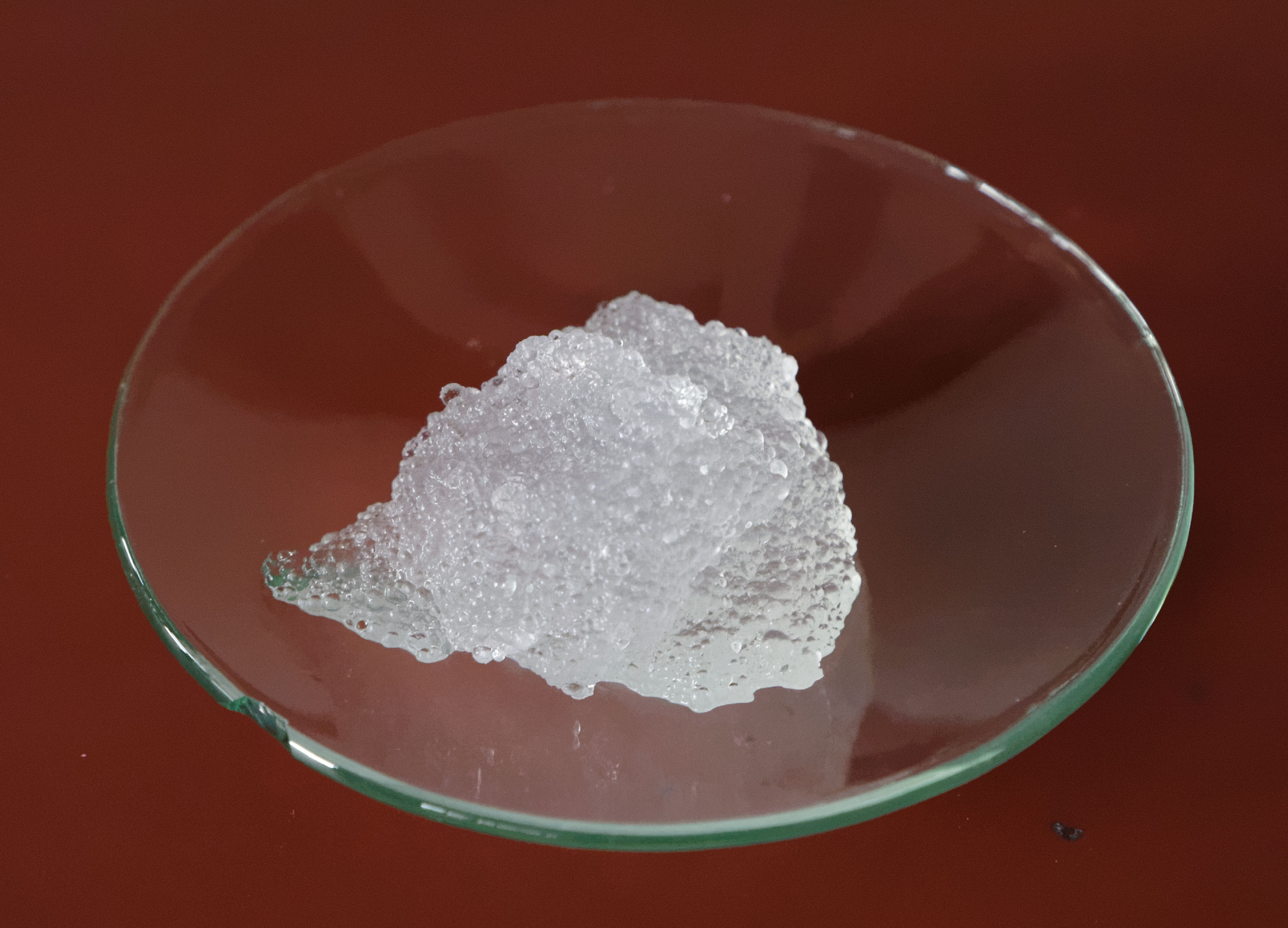
Hydrogel of a superabsorbent polymer

A hydrogel is a network of polymer chains that are hydrophilic, sometimes found as a colloidal gel in which water is the dispersion medium. A three-dimensional solid results from the hydrophilic polymer chains being held together by cross-links. Because of the inherent cross-links, the structural integrity of the hydrogel network does not dissolve from the high concentration of water. Hydrogels are highly absorbent (they can contain over 90% water) natural or synthetic polymeric networks. Hydrogels also possess a degree of flexibility very similar to natural tissue, due to their significant water content. As responsive "smart materials," hydrogels can encapsulate chemical systems which upon stimulation by external factors such as a change of pH may cause specific compounds such as glucose to be liberated to the environment, in most cases by a gel-sol transition to the liquid state. Chemomechanical polymers are mostly also hydrogels, which upon stimulation change their volume and can serve as actuators or sensors. The first appearance of the term 'hydrogel' in the literature was in 1894.

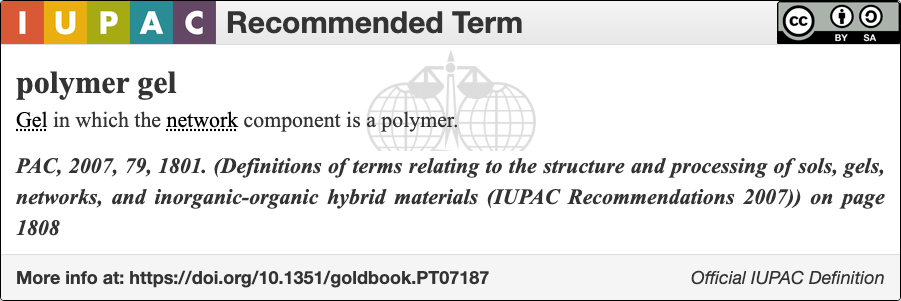
IUPAC definition for a polymer gel

=== Organogels ===
An organogel is a non-crystalline, non-glassy thermoreversible (thermoplastic) solid material composed of a liquid organic phase entrapped in a three-dimensionally cross-linked network. The liquid can be, for example, an organic solvent, mineral oil, or vegetable oil. The solubility and particle dimensions of the structurant are important characteristics for the elastic properties and firmness of the organogel. Often, these systems are based on self-assembly of the structurant molecules. (An example of formation of an undesired thermoreversible network is the occurrence of wax crystallization in petroleum.)

Organogels have potential for use in a number of applications, such as in pharmaceuticals, cosmetics, art conservation, and food.

=== Xerogels ===
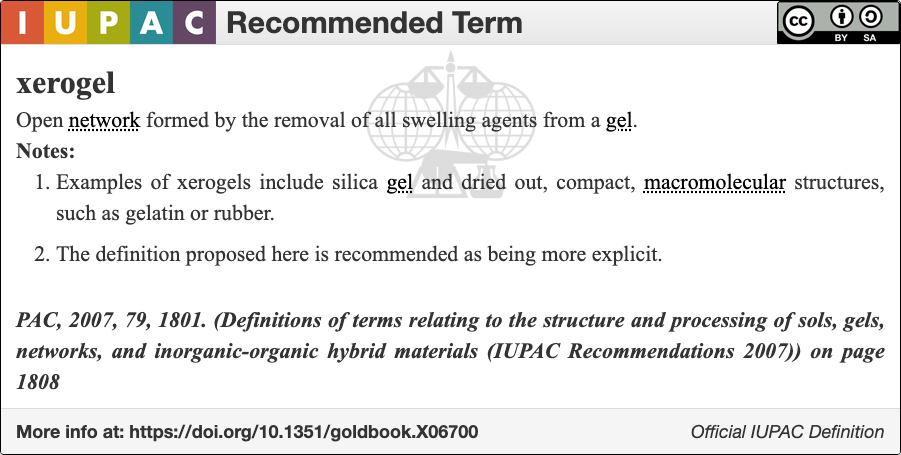
https://doi.org/10.1351/goldbook.X06700.

A xerogel /ˈzɪəroʊˌdʒɛl/ is a solid formed from a gel by drying with unhindered shrinkage. Xerogels usually retain high porosity (15–50%) and enormous surface area (150–900 m^{2}/g), along with very small pore size (1–10 nm). When solvent removal occurs under supercritical conditions, the network does not shrink and a highly porous, low-density material known as an aerogel is produced. Heat treatment of a xerogel at elevated temperature produces viscous sintering (shrinkage of the xerogel due to a small amount of viscous flow) which results in a denser and more robust solid, the density and porosity achieved depend on the sintering conditions.

=== Nanocomposite hydrogels ===
Nanocomposite hydrogels or hybrid hydrogels, are highly hydrated polymeric networks, either physically or covalently crosslinked with each other and/or with nanoparticles or nanostructures. Nanocomposite hydrogels can mimic native tissue properties, structure and microenvironment due to their hydrated and interconnected porous structure. A wide range of nanoparticles, such as carbon-based, polymeric, ceramic, and metallic nanomaterials can be incorporated within the hydrogel structure to obtain nanocomposites with tailored functionality. Nanocomposite hydrogels can be engineered to possess superior physical, chemical, electrical, thermal, and biological properties.

== Properties ==
Many gels display thixotropy – they become fluid when agitated, but resolidify when resting. In general, gels are apparently solid, jelly-like materials. It is a type of non-Newtonian fluid. By replacing the liquid with gas it is possible to prepare aerogels, materials with exceptional properties including very low density, high specific surface areas, and excellent thermal insulation properties.

=== Thermodynamics of gel deformation ===
A gel is in essence the mixture of a polymer network and a solvent phase. Upon stretching, the network crosslinks are moved further apart from each other. Due to the polymer strands between crosslinks acting as entropic springs, gels demonstrate elasticity like rubber (which is just a polymer network, without solvent). This is so because the free energy penalty to stretch an ideal polymer segment $N$ monomers of size $b$ between crosslinks to an end-to-end distance $R$ is approximately given by

$$F_\text{ela} \sim kT \frac{R^2}{Nb^2}.$$

This is the origin of both gel and rubber elasticity. But one key difference is that gel contains an additional solvent phase and hence is capable of having significant volume changes under deformation by taking in and out solvent. For example, a gel could swell to several times its initial volume after being immersed in a solvent after equilibrium is reached. This is the phenomenon of gel swelling. On the contrary, if we take the swollen gel out and allow the solvent to evaporate, the gel would shrink to roughly its original size. This gel volume change can alternatively be introduced by applying external forces. If a uniaxial compressive stress is applied to a gel, some solvent contained in the gel would be squeezed out and the gel shrinks in the applied-stress direction.

To study the gel mechanical state in equilibrium, a good starting point is to consider a cubic gel of volume $V_{0}$ that is stretched by factors $\lambda_1$, $\lambda_2$ and $\lambda_3$ in the three orthogonal directions during swelling after being immersed in a solvent phase of initial volume $V_{s0}$. The final deformed volume of gel is then $\lambda_1\lambda_2\lambda_3V_{0}$ and the total volume of the system is $V_{0}+V_{s0}$, that is assumed constant during the swelling process for simplicity of treatment. The swollen state of the gel is now completely characterized by stretch factors $\lambda_1$, $\lambda_2$ and $\lambda_3$ and hence it is of interest to derive the deformation free energy as a function of them, denoted as $f_\text{gel}(\lambda_1,\lambda_2,\lambda_3)$. For analogy to the historical treatment of rubber elasticity and mixing free energy, $f_\text{gel}(\lambda_1,\lambda_2,\lambda_3)$ is most often defined as the free energy difference after and before the swelling normalized by the initial gel volume $V_{0}$, that is, a free energy difference density. The form of $f_\text{gel}(\lambda_1,\lambda_2,\lambda_3)$ naturally assumes two contributions of radically different physical origins, one associated with the elastic deformation of the polymer network, and the other with the mixing of the network with the solvent. Hence, we write

$$f_\text{gel}(\lambda_1, \lambda_2, \lambda_3) = f_\text{net}(\lambda_1, \lambda_2, \lambda_3) + f_\text{mix}(\lambda_1, \lambda_2, \lambda_3).$$

We now consider the two contributions separately. The polymer elastic deformation term is independent of the solvent phase and has the same expression as a rubber, as derived in the Kuhn's theory of rubber elasticity:

$$f_\text{net}(\lambda_1,\lambda_2,\lambda_3) = \frac{G_0}{2} (\lambda_1^2 + \lambda_2^2 + \lambda_3^2 - 3),$$

where $G_0$ denotes the shear modulus of the initial state. On the other hand, the mixing term $f_\text{mix}(\lambda_1,\lambda_2,\lambda_3)$ is usually treated by the Flory-Huggins free energy of concentrated polymer solutions $f(\phi)$, where $\phi$ is polymer volume fraction. Suppose the initial gel has a polymer volume fraction of $\phi_0$, the polymer volume fraction after swelling would be $\phi=\phi_0/\lambda_1\lambda_2\lambda_3$ since the number of monomers remains the same while the gel volume has increased by a factor of $\lambda_1\lambda_2\lambda_3$. As the polymer volume fraction decreases from $\phi_0$ to $\phi$, a polymer solution of concentration $\phi_0$ and volume $V_{0}$ is mixed with a pure solvent of volume $(\lambda_1\lambda_2\lambda_3-1)V_{0}$ to become a solution with polymer concentration $\phi$ and volume $\lambda_1\lambda_2\lambda_3V_{0}$. The free energy density change in this mixing step is given as

$$V_{g0} f_\text{mix}(\lambda_1 \lambda_2 \lambda_3) = \lambda_1 \lambda_2 \lambda_3 f(\phi) - [V_0 f(\phi_0) + (\lambda_1 \lambda_2\lambda_3 - 1) f(0)],$$

where on the right-hand side, the first term is the Flory–Huggins energy density of the final swollen gel, the second is associated with the initial gel and the third is of the pure solvent prior to mixing. Substitution of $\phi = \phi_0/\lambda_1\lambda_2\lambda_3$ leads to

$$f_\text{mix}(\lambda_1, \lambda_2, \lambda_3) = \frac{\phi_0}{\phi} [f(\phi) - f(0)] - [f(\phi_0) - f(0)].$$

Note that the second term is independent of the stretching factors $\lambda_1$, $\lambda_2$ and $\lambda_3$ and hence can be dropped in subsequent analysis. Now we make use of the Flory-Huggins free energy for a polymer-solvent solution that reads

$$f(\phi) = \frac{kT}{v_c} [\frac{\phi}{N} \ln\phi + (1 - \phi) \ln(1 - \phi) + \chi \phi (1 - \phi)],$$

where $v_c$ is monomer volume, $N$ is polymer strand length and $\chi$ is the Flory-Huggins energy parameter. Because in a network, the polymer length is effectively infinite, we can take the limit $N\to\infty$ and $f(\phi)$ reduces to

$$f(\phi) = \frac{kT}{v_c} [(1 - \phi) \ln(1 - \phi) + \chi \phi(1 - \phi)].$$

Substitution of this expression into $f_\text{mix}(\lambda_1,\lambda_2,\lambda_3)$ and addition of the network contribution leads to

$$f_\text{gel}(\lambda_1, \lambda_2, \lambda_3) = \frac{G_0}{2} (\lambda_1^2 + \lambda_2^2 + \lambda_3^2) + \frac{\phi_0}{\phi} f(\phi).$$

This provides the starting point to examining the swelling equilibrium of a gel network immersed in solvent. It can be shown that gel swelling is the competition between two forces, one is the osmotic pressure of the polymer solution that favors the take in of solvent and expansion, the other is the restoring force of the polymer network elasticity that favors shrinkage. At equilibrium, the two effects exactly cancel each other in principle and the associated $\lambda_1$, $\lambda_2$ and $\lambda_3$ define the equilibrium gel volume. In solving the force balance equation, graphical solutions are often preferred.

In an alternative, scaling approach, suppose an isotropic gel is stretch by a factor of $\lambda$ in all three directions. Under the affine network approximation, the mean-square end-to-end distance in the gel increases from initial $R_0^2$ to $(\lambda R_0)^2$ and the elastic energy of one stand can be written as

$$F_\text{ela} \sim kT \frac{(\lambda R_0)^2}{R_\text{ref}^2},$$

where $R_\text{ref}$ is the mean-square fluctuation in end-to-end distance of one strand. The modulus of the gel is then this single-strand elastic energy multiplied by strand number density $\nu=\phi/Nb^3$ to give

$$G(\phi) \sim \frac{kT}{b^3} \frac{\phi}{N} \frac{(\lambda R_0)^2}{R_\text{ref}^2}.$$

This modulus can then be equated to osmotic pressure (through differentiation of the free energy) to give the same equation as we found above.

=== Modified Donnan equilibrium of polyelectrolyte gels ===
Consider a hydrogel made of polyelectrolytes decorated with weak acid groups that can ionize according to the reaction

$$\text{HA} \rightleftharpoons \text{A}^- + \text{H}^+$$

is immersed in a salt solution of physiological concentration. The degree of ionization of the polyelectrolytes is then controlled by the $\text{pH}$ and due to the charged nature of $\text{H}^+$ and $\text{A}^-$, electrostatic interactions with other ions in the systems. This is effectively a reacting system governed by acid-base equilibrium modulated by electrostatic effects, and is relevant in drug delivery, sea water desalination and dialysis technologies. Due to the elastic nature of the gel, the dispersion of $\text{A}^-$ in the system is constrained and hence, there will be a partitioning of salts ions and $\text{H}^+$ inside and outside the gel, which is intimately coupled to the polyelectrolyte degree of ionization. This ion partitioning inside and outside the gel is analogous to the partitioning of ions across a semipemerable membrane in classical Donnan theory, but a membrane is not needed here because the gel volume constraint imposed by network elasticity effectively acts its role, in preventing the macroions to pass through the fictitious membrane while allowing ions to pass.

The coupling between the ion partitioning and polyelectrolyte ionization degree is only partially by the classical Donnan theory. As a starting point we can neglect the electrostatic interactions among ions. Then at equilibrium, some of the weak acid sites in the gel would dissociate to form $\text{A}^-$that electrostatically attracts positive charged $\text{H}^+$ and salt cations leading to a relatively high concentration of $\text{H}^+$ and salt cations inside the gel. But because the concentration of $\text{H}^+$ is locally higher, it suppresses the further ionization of the acid sites. This phenomenon is the prediction of the classical Donnan theory. However, with electrostatic interactions, there are further complications to the picture. Consider the case of two adjacent, initially uncharged acid sites $\text{HA}$ are both dissociated to form $\text{A}^-$. Since the two sites are both negatively charged, there will be a charge-charge repulsion along the backbone of the polymer than tends to stretch the chain. This energy cost is high both elastically and electrostatically and hence suppress ionization. Even though this ionization suppression is qualitatively similar to that of Donnan prediction, it is absent without electrostatic consideration and present irrespective of ion partitioning. The combination of both effects as well as gel elasticity determines the volume of the gel at equilibrium. Due to the complexity of the coupled acid-base equilibrium, electrostatics and network elasticity, only recently has such system been correctly recreated in computer simulations.

== Animal-produced gels ==
Some species secrete gels that are effective in parasite control. For example, the long-finned pilot whale secretes an enzymatic gel that rests on the outer surface of this animal and helps prevent other organisms from establishing colonies on the surface of these whales' bodies.

Hydrogels existing naturally in the body include mucus, the vitreous humor of the eye, cartilage, tendons and blood clots. Their viscoelastic nature results in the soft tissue component of the body, disparate from the mineral-based hard tissue of the skeletal system. Researchers are actively developing synthetically derived tissue replacement technologies derived from hydrogels, for both temporary implants (degradable) and permanent implants (non-degradable). A review article on the subject discusses the use of hydrogels for nucleus pulposus replacement, cartilage replacement, and synthetic tissue models.

== Applications ==
Many substances can form gels when a suitable thickener or gelling agent is added to their formula. This approach is common in the manufacture of a wide range of products, from foods to paints and adhesives.

In fiber optic communications, a soft gel resembling hair gel in viscosity is used to fill the plastic tubes containing the fibers. The main purpose of the gel is to prevent water intrusion if the buffer tube is breached, but the gel also buffers the fibers against mechanical damage when the tube is bent around corners during installation, or flexed. Additionally, the gel acts as a processing aid when the cable is being constructed, keeping the fibers central whilst the tube material is extruded around it.

== Smart gel ==
Smart gel is a type of smart material that actively changes its volume and properties (hydrophilicity/hydrophobicity) in response to changes in the external environment, such as temperature, pH, light, and electric fields. It is expected to be a next-generation energy-saving and medical technology, with applications including temperature-responsive research into recovering moisture from the air as water, drug delivery systems, and medical biocompatible patches.

== See also ==
- Aerogel
- 2-Acrylamido-2-methylpropane sulfonic acid
- Agarose gel electrophoresis
- Food rheology
- Gel electrophoresis
- Gel filtration chromatography
- Gel pack
- Gel permeation chromatography
- Hydrocolloid
- Ouchterlony double immunodiffusion
- Paste (rheology)
- Polyacrylamide gel electrophoresis
- Radial immunodiffusion
- Silicone gel
- Smart gel
- Two-dimensional gel electrophoresis
- Void (composites)
- Soft matter
- Equilibrium gel
