= TPM =

TPM or tpm may refer to:

== Organizations ==
- The Pentecostal Mission, a Pentecostal religious denomination in Tamil Nadu, India
- TPG Telecom, an Australian Securities Exchange symbol
- Te Pāti Māori, a New Zealand political party

== Publishing ==
- The Philosophers' Magazine, an independent quarterly magazine
- Talking Points Memo, a political blog run by Joshua Marshall

== Science and technology ==
- Tethered particle motion, a biophysical single-molecule experiment method
- Technical program manager, a product manager with a background or a focus on engineering
- Transcripts per million, a measure of gene expression in RNA-Seq

=== Computing ===
- Trusted Platform Module, a specification for a secure cryptoprocessor included with some computers
- Tivoli Provisioning Manager, a software product by IBM
- Trade promotion management, software that supports the management of trade promotion
- Technical protection measures, another name for digital rights management

== Other uses ==
- Tea Party movement, an American political movement
- Technical performance measure, a term used by the U.S. military for key technical goals
- Technology Park Malaysia, a research and development centre
- Total productive maintenance, an equipment maintenance program
- T. P. M. Mohideen Khan (born 1947), Minister for Environment in the Tamil Nadu state of India
- Tampulma language, an ISO 639-3 code

== See also ==
- Star Wars: Episode I – The Phantom Menace, an episode in the Star Wars saga
