= Vladimir Pokrovskii =

Russian scientist (born 1934)

Vladimir N. Pokrovskii
- Born: 11 May 1934 (age 92); Altayskoye, Altaysky District, Altai Krai
- Education: Tomsk State University
- Known for: polymer physics econodynamics
- Scientific career
- Fields: Physics, Dynamics of complex systems
- Thesis: (1974)

Vladimir Nikolajevich Pokrovskii (Russian: Влад’имир Никол’аевич Покр’овский; born 11 May 1934) is a Russian scientist known for his contributions to polymer physics and economic theory.

== Education and career ==
Pokrovskii was born on 11 May 1934 into a Russian family in the rural locality Altayskoye, Altaysky District, Altai Krai (Russian: Алтайское, Алтайского края), Russia. He graduated from Tomsk State University in Siberia as a physicist in 1958 and in the same year was employed as a teacher of physics at Tomsk Polytechnic University. In 1964 he moved to the Institute of Chemical Physics of the Academy of Sciences of the USSR (Chernogolovka, Moscow region) as a senior research fellow, where he engaged in the study of suspensions and polymers. He received the Candidate of Sciences degree (1968) and the Doctor of Sciences (1977) in physics and mathematics. Since 1980, he has managed the department of applied mathematics of the Altai Polytechnic Institute (now Altai State Technical University), (Barnaul, Russia), and in 1981 he was appointed professor of applied mathematics. From 1987-1995 he was professor and head of the department of applied mathematics at Moscow University of Economics, Statistics and Informatics (МЭСИ, the Russian abbreviation). He worked on methods for modelling economic processes and undertakes studies in the field of the mathematical description of economic growth, focused on better understanding the role of energy and the formulation of a generalized labour theory of value.

Since 1995 Vladimir Nikolaevich has been a visiting professor at Maltese University. He gives lectures on statistical physics and is engaged in research work.

== Research ==
=== Dynamics of suspensions ===
In order to describe the dynamic behaviour of polymer solutions and molecular liquids, suspensions of rigid or semi-rigid particles were used as simple heuristic models. The development of constitutive equations of the flowing dilute suspension of rigid ellipsoids was apparently the first example of microrheological constitutive equations of complex fluid. The rigid ellipsoids model was also used to explain optical anisotropy and relaxation phenomena of the molecular systems. The suspension of rigid particles in an anisotropic fluid provides a qualitative description of behaviour of liquid crystals.

=== Polymer dynamics ===
According to earlier work by Sam Edwards and Pierre-Gilles de Gennes, the properties of certain linear polymers could be modeled as a reptation, a special movement of a long macromolecule among other macromolecules in the manner of a snake. Pokrovskii and his collaborators developed the theory of stochastic thermal motion of long macromolecules among similar macromolecules (in the entangled system) and confirmed the existence of reptation in the region of molecular mass above 10 times the length between 'entanglements' and identified the internal relaxation processes in polymers from the molecular point of view. The theory is applicable to the theory of viscoelasticity, diffusion and a number of other features of linear polymeric materials.

=== Econodynamics ===
Economic dynamics is an empirical science that studies emergences, motion and disappearance of value—a specific concept that is used for description of the processes of creation and distribution of wealth. The theory is formulated as empirical science on the creation, motion and disappearance of value, which can also be considered as technological theory of social production. Any economic theory deals with the interpretation of economic processes based on the law of production of value, and various scientific approaches differ in the choice of factors of production that determine, in the end, the creation of wealth. Marxists insist that only labor creates value, neoclassicists believe that, in addition to labor, capital must also be taken into account as the important source of value. Econodynamics demonstrates, and this is an achievement of V.N. Pokrovskii, that the observed substitution of labour by capital is, in fact, the substitution of labour by work of external energy sources, and the statement about the productive power of capital is a hoax that hides the real role of labor and energy in the production of value. Human effort and the work of external energy sources appears to be the true sources of value; productivity of capital is eventually productivity of working people and substitutive work. It has led to the understanding of the role of energy and, eventually, to the generalization of the labour theory of value. Econodynamics offers a more adequate interpretation of economic growth and other phenomena. Econodynamics is based on the achievements of classical political economy and neo-classical economics and has been using the methods of phenomenological science to investigate evolution of economic system. Econodynamics has been proposing methods of analysis and forecasting of economic processes. The comprehensive review of the problems of econodynamics is available..

=== Dynamics of complex thermodynamic systems ===
To consider the complex systems with some internal structure, such as polymers, living organisms, social organisations and so on, V.N. Pokrovskii reformulated the principles of nonequilibrium thermodynamics, using the concept of internal variables that describe deviations of thermodynamic systems from the equilibrium state. Considering the first law of thermodynamics, work of internal variables is introduced and internal thermal energy of non-equilibrium systems is taken into account. It is shown that the requirement that the thermodynamic system cannot fulfil any work via internal variables is equivalent to the conventional formulation of the second law of thermodynamics. These statements, in line with the axioms introducing internal variables can be considered as basic principles of nonequilibrium thermodynamics. It is shown that known linear parities between thermodynamic forces and fluxes and also the entropy production, as a sum of products of thermodynamic forces and fluxes, are consequences (valid only in linear area and for steady-state situations) of fundamental principles of thermodynamics. Among the numerous applications of non-equilibrium thermodynamics, it appears to be a description of living organism as an open thermodynamic system, which allows formulating the thermodynamic equation of growth. The schematisation of the production by an open thermodynamic system allows formulation of four forms of production function.
