= Zero Point Frontiers Corporation =

Zero Point Frontiers Corp.
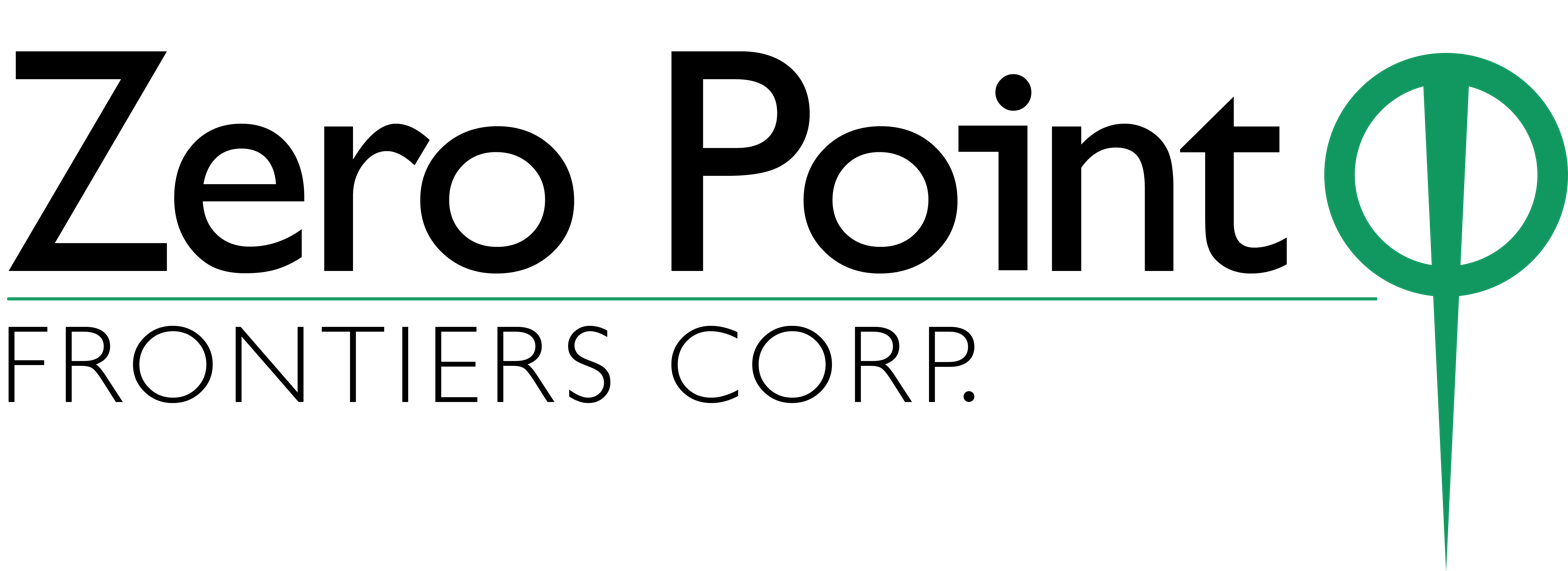
- Industry: Aerospace
- Founded: 2008; Huntsville, Alabama
- Founders: Jason Hundley; Stuart Feldman (exited 2012)
- Headquarters: Huntsville, Alabama, United States
- Number of employees: ~30 (April 2016)
- Website: www.zeropointfrontiers.com

Zero Point Frontiers Corporation (ZPFC) is a private aerospace firm based in Huntsville, Alabama. They, along with several other companies such as SpaceX, Blue Origin and Firefly Space Systems are proponents of NewSpace: a movement in the aerospace industry whose objective is to increase access to space through innovative technical advances resulting in a reduction of launch cost, and the lessening of regulations and logistical restrictions associated with dependence on national space institutions.

== History ==
Founded in 2008, ZPFC initially assisted numerous government and commercial agencies and supported multiple vehicle and technology trade studies for the Ares Launch Projects and later the Space Launch System (SLS). ZPFC's work was also integral to NASA’s efforts to identify the key requirements, configurations, missions, and propulsion systems needed to shape heavy-lift launch vehicles for human missions beyond Low-Earth Orbit (LEO).

Zero Point Frontiers has worked with commercial space flight companies such as Virgin Galactic, Golden Spike, Andrews Space, and Firefly Space Systems to provide engineering services.

== 3D printing and additive manufacturing ==
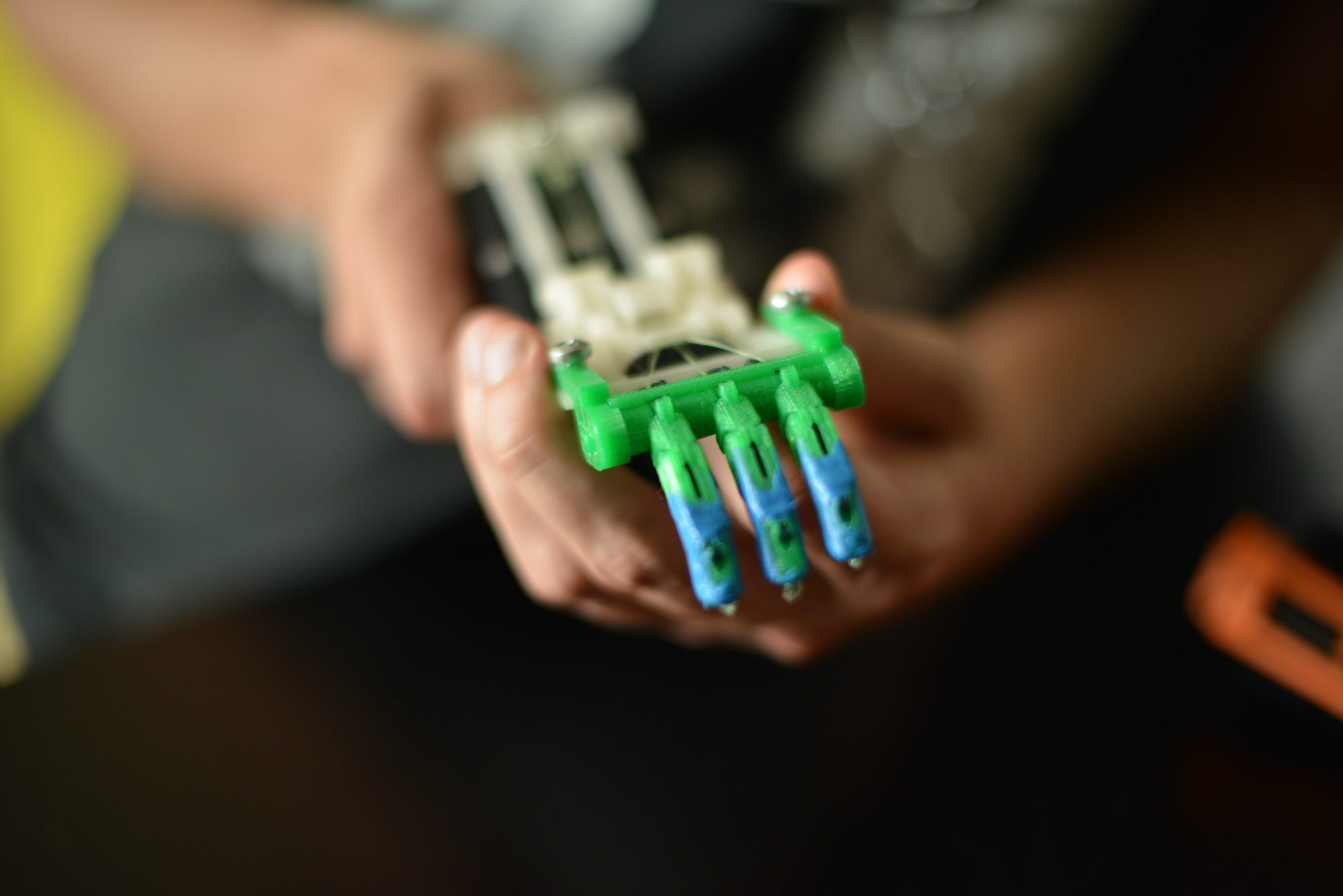
3D-printed low-cost prosthetic hand prototype.

Zero Point Frontiers utilizes in-house 3D printing to rapidly produce prototypes and design concept models, and exercises the application of additive manufacturing to increase efficiencies in both cost and schedule. These applications are cross-discipline, ranging from the design and manufacturing of low cost prosthetics for children using consumer grade polymer FDM 3D printers, to manufacturing process improvements of RS-25 rocket engine components using advanced Selective Laser Melting and Laser Deposition Welding techniques.

In 2014 ZPFC assisted students of the University of Alabama Huntsville and College of Charleston with the rapid prototyping of a 2U CubeSat frame for use in their class project, FOCUS (Functional Ocular CubeSat Utilizing a Smartphone). The high-altitude balloon travelled to, and maintained an altitude of, 78,835 ft for over 36 minutes while performing the students’ experiments.

== Software development ==
Zero Point Frontiers has developed a number of software tools in-house to aid in the design and development of space systems.

=== BLAST (Beyond Low Earth Orbit (LEO) Architecture Sizing Tool) ===
In partnership with NASA Johnson Space Center, ZPFC developed a new approach to high-level space architecture design and analysis. The tool couples extensive research in Mass Estimating Relationships (MER) with the ability to assess changes to a mission instantly via simultaneous sensitivity sweeps of several parameters. The tool generates data for human-rated vehicles rapidly, by providing a shareable, repeatable, and rigorous end-to-end framework for multiple in-space elements and is anchored in historical data where existing MERs have been re-designed to incorporate present-day technologies and space assets. All metadata used to formulate the subsystem MERs is easily accessible within the tools, allowing the user to identify the assumptions behind the data.

=== Decision Tool ===
ZPFC developed a tool based upon the analytical hierarchy process to assist with complex decision making activities. The decision tool uses pairwise comparison of Technical Performance Measures (TPMs) to weigh Figures of Merit (FOMs) in areas such as:

- Operations
- Performance
- Programmatics
- Strategy
- Sustainability

The desires of multiple stakeholders can be assessed within any system and show decision options that stakeholders hold as most favorable, while identifying the least favorable options for removal from the trade-space. ZPFC is currently developing a commercially available Decision Tool application that will be applicable to almost any critical decision requiring quantitative and qualitative comparisons.

=== Instarocket ===
Instarocket is a publicly available educational iPad app and first-order estimation tool for the sizing of launch vehicles in order to get a desired payload to orbit. The user can specify the fuel type, engine performance parameters, and key ratios to calculate the stage masses. Then the user can use interactive slider bars to adjust propellant loads in each stage. The app updates the drawing and performance estimates in real time while the user is adjusting the sizing.

=== eLVis (Engineering Launch Vehicle Initial Sizing) ===
The Engineering Launch Vehicle Initial Sizing tool (eLVis) is a tool for estimating launch vehicle for desired mission. It shares the performance prediction engine with Instarocket, and allows for large numbers of data value sweeps to find optimum propellant splits between the various stages of the vehicle. Users can quickly set up new concepts and compare them to multiple concepts and existing vehicles.
