= Rubber band experiment =

The rubber band experiment demonstrates entropic force and a refrigeration cycle using a simple rubber band. The rubber band experiment is performed by sensing the temperature of a rubber band as it is stretched, and then released. The rubber band first heats up as its stretched, then allowed to equilibrate back to room temperature. The rubber band cools below room temperature when the tension is released, the effect is large enough to be noticed by touch. The rubber band experiment is often used as a simple example when explaining entropy and energy in high school physics classes.

== Thermodynamic model ==
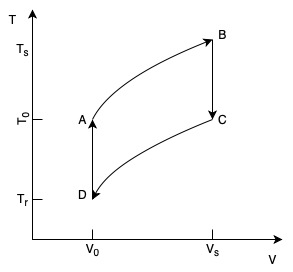
The T-V diagram of the rubber band experiment

The decrease in the temperature of the rubber band in a spontaneous process at ambient temperature can be explained using the Helmholtz free energy
$$\begin{align}
dF = \tau dL -  S dT
\end{align}$$
where dF is the change in free energy, dL is the change in length, τ is the tension, dT is the change in temperature and S is the entropy. Rearranging to see the change in temperature we obtain
$$\begin{align}
dT = \frac{\tau}{S} dL -  \frac{1}{S} dF
\end{align}$$
. In a spontaneous process dF is negative and τ, S are positive and in this case dL is negative and it's possible for dT to be negative.

The rubber band experiment can be modeled as a thermodynamic cycle as shown in the diagram. The stretching of the rubber band is an isobaric expansion (A → B) that increases the energy but reduces the entropy (this is a property of a rubber bands due to rubber elasticity). Holding the rubber band in tension at ambient temperature is an isochoric cooling process (B → C) in which the energy decreases (and the entropy remains approximately stable). Releasing the tension from the rubber band is a process of isobaric cooling (C → D) in which the energy decreases but the entropy increases. The rubber band then equilibrates back to room temperature in an isochoric heating process (D → A) completing the cycle.

== A simple qualitative model ==
The model can be derived from two experimental observations on rubber bands. The first is that the internal energy of a rubber band is independent of length: U=c L_{0}T where c is a constant L_{0} is the resting length of the rubber band and T is the temperature. The second is that tension in a rubber band increases linearly with the length of the rubber band up to the elasticity limit,
$$\begin{align}
\tau = \overline{b}T \frac{L - L_0}{L_1 - L_0} = b T \Delta L
\end{align}$$
where τ is the tension, L_{1} is the elasticity limit, L is the current length, b is a constant, T is the temperature and ΔL is change in length of the rubber band. Requiring the consistency of two equations of state we obtain the condition
$$\begin{align}
&  \frac {\partial }{\partial L} \frac{1}{T} =  - \frac {\partial }{\partial U} \frac{\tau}{T}
\end{align}$$
. Integrating the result we obtain
$$\begin{align}
&  d S = \frac{1}{T}dU  -\frac{\tau}{T}dL = cL_0 \frac{dU}{U} -b \Delta L dL
\end{align}$$
where dS is the change in entropy. We can see that the entropy of a rubber band will decrease when stretched. After the rubber band equilibrates back to room temperature it has the same internal energy it had at the beginning according to our model but a lower entropy because dU is 0 and b, ΔL and dL are positive. When removing the tension the rubber band will spontaneously equilibrate to a lower energy and higher entropy state resulting in lower temperature.

== Ideal chain polymer ==
The decrease in the entropy of a rubber band can be explained using the ideal chain model, where the rubber band can be modeled as a bundle of long chain polymers. The free variables are the angles between links in the polymer. The longer the polymer the fewer possible permutations of angles exist resulting in length L. Using the definition of entropy in the ideal chain model
$$\begin{align}
S(L) = K_B \ln \Omega(L)
\end{align}$$
where K_{B} is the Boltzmann constant and Ω is the number of possible permutations of the polymer. As the rubber band is being stretched Ω decreases as a function of length and therefore the entropy decreases as a function of length.
