= Worm-like chain =

Simple model of a polymer

The worm-like chain (WLC) model in polymer physics is used to describe the behavior of polymers that are semi-flexible: fairly stiff with successive segments pointing in roughly the same direction, and with persistence length within a few orders of magnitude of the polymer length. The WLC model is the continuous version of the Kratky–Porod model.

== Model elements ==
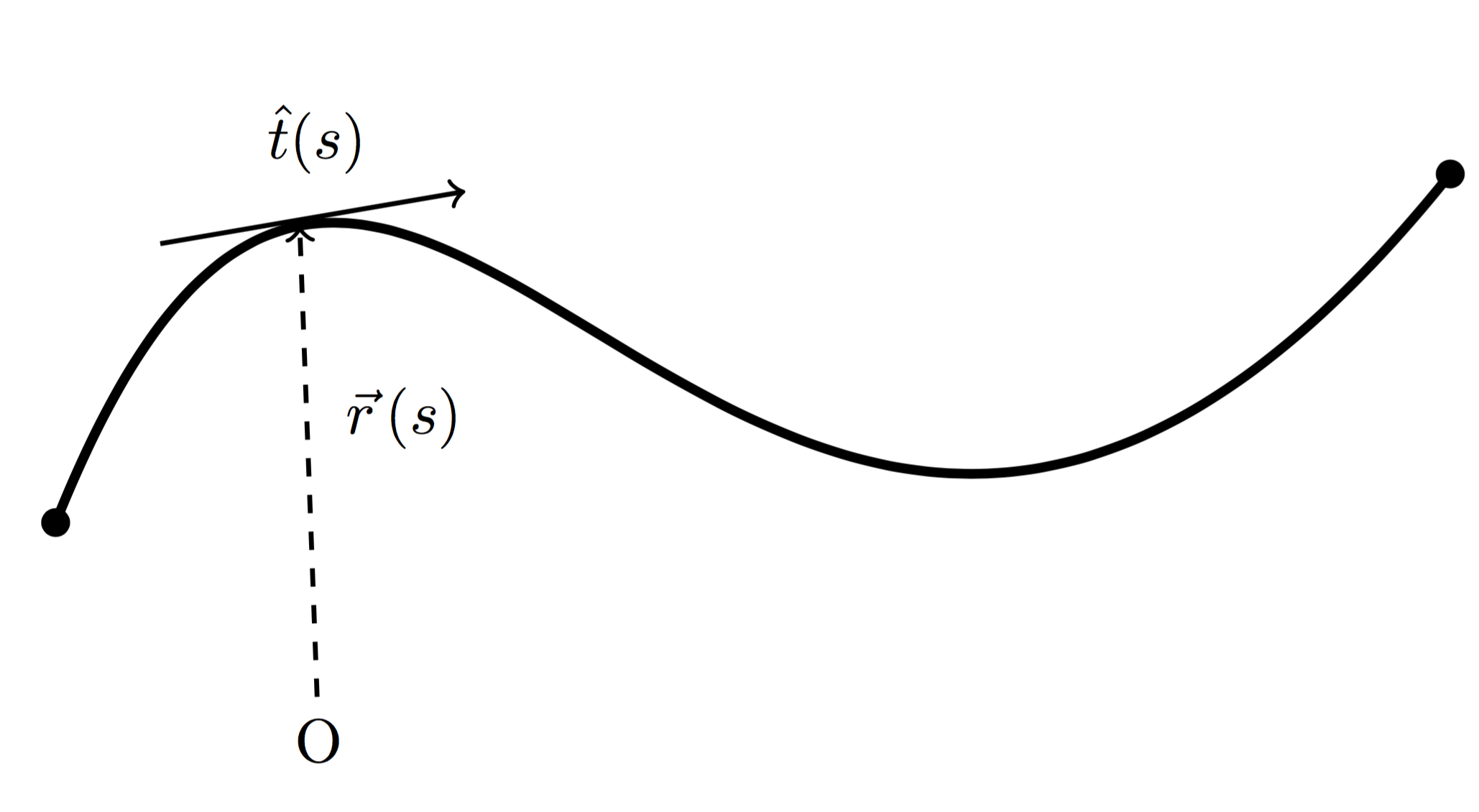
An illustration of the WLC model, with position and unit tangent vectors as shown.

The WLC model envisions a continuously flexible isotropic rod. This is in contrast to the freely-jointed chain model, which is only flexible between discrete freely hinged segments. The model is particularly suited for describing stiffer polymers, with successive segments displaying a sort of cooperativity: nearby segments are roughly aligned. At room temperature, the polymer adopts a smoothly curved conformation; at $T = 0$ K, the polymer adopts a rigid rod conformation.

For a polymer of maximum length $L_0$, parametrize the path of the polymer as $s \in(0,L_0)$. Allow $\hat t(s)$ to be the unit tangent vector to the chain at point $s$, and $\vec r(s)$ to be the position vector along the chain, as shown to the right. Then:

$\hat t(s) \equiv \frac {\partial \vec r(s) }{\partial s}$ and the end-to-end distance $\vec R = \int_{0}^{L_0}\hat t(s) ds$ .

The energy associated with the bending of the polymer can be written as:

$E = \frac {1}{2}k_B T \int_{0}^{L_0} P \cdot \left (\frac {\partial^2 \vec r(s) }{\partial s^2}\right )^{2} ds$

where $P$ is the polymer's characteristic persistence length, $k_B$ is the Boltzmann constant, and $T$ is the absolute temperature. At finite temperatures, the end-to end distance of the polymer will be significantly shorter than the maximum length $L_0$. This is caused by thermal fluctuations, which result in a coiled, random configuration of the undisturbed polymer.

The polymer's orientation correlation function can then be solved for, and it follows an exponential decay with decay constant 1/P:

$\langle\hat t(s) \cdot \hat t(0)\rangle=\langle \cos \; \theta (s)\rangle = e^{-s/P}\,$

Mean squared end-to-end distance as a function of persistence length.

A useful value is the mean square end-to-end distance of the polymer:

$\langle R^{2} \rangle = \langle \vec R \cdot \vec R \rangle = \left\langle \int_{0}^{L_0} \hat t(s) ds \cdot \int_{0}^{L_0} \hat t(s') ds' \right\rangle = \int_{0}^{L_0} ds \int_{0}^{L_0} \langle \hat t(s) \cdot \hat t(s') \rangle ds'= \int_{0}^{L_0} ds \int_{0}^{L_0} e^{-\left | s - s' \right | / P} ds'$

$\langle R^{2} \rangle = 2 PL_0 \left [ 1 - \frac {P}{L_0} \left ( 1 - e^{-L_0/P} \right ) \right ]$

Note that in the limit of $L_0 \gg P$, then $\langle R^{2} \rangle = 2PL_0$. This can be used to show that a Kuhn segment is equal to twice the persistence length of a worm-like chain. In the limit of $L_0 \ll P$, then $\langle R^{2} \rangle = L_0^2$, and the polymer displays rigid rod behavior. The figure to the right shows the crossover from flexible to stiff behavior as the persistence length increases.

Comparison between the worm-like chain model and experimental data from the stretching of λ-DNA.

== Biological relevance ==
Experimental data from the stretching of Lambda phage DNA is shown to the right, with force measurements determined by analysis of Brownian fluctuations of a bead attached to the DNA. A persistence length of 51.35 nm and a contour length of 15.609 μm were used for the model, which is depicted by the solid line.

Other biologically important polymers that can be effectively modeled as worm-like chains include:

- double-stranded DNA (persistence length 40-50 nm) and RNA (persistence length 64 nm)
- single-stranded DNA (persistence length 4 nm)
- unstructured RNA (persistence length 2 nm)
- unstructured proteins (persistence length 0.6-0.7 nm)
- microtubules (persistence length 0.52 cm)
- filamentous bacteriophage

== Stretching worm-like chain polymers ==
Upon stretching, the accessible spectrum of thermal fluctuations reduces, which causes an entropic force acting against the external elongation. This entropic force can be estimated from considering the total energy of the polymer:

$H = H_{\rm elastic} + H_{\rm external}= \frac {1}{2}k_B T \int_{0}^{L_0} P \cdot \left (\frac {\partial^2 \vec r(s) }{\partial s^2}\right )^{2} ds - xF$.

Here, the contour length is represented by $L_0$, the persistence length by $P$, the extension is represented by $x$, and external force is represented by $F$.

Laboratory tools such as atomic force microscopy (AFM) and optical tweezers have been used to characterize the force-dependent stretching behavior of biological polymers. An interpolation formula that approximates the force-extension behavior with about 15% relative error is:

$$\frac {FP} {k_{B}T} = \frac {1}{4} \left ( 1 - \frac {x} {L_0} \right )^{-2} - \frac {1}{4} + \frac {x}{L_0}$$

A more accurate approximation for the force-extension behavior with about 0.01% relative error is:

$$\frac {FP} {k_{B}T} = \frac {1}{4} \left ( 1 - \frac {x} {L_0} \right )^{-2} - \frac {1}{4} + \frac {x}{L_0} + \sum_{i=2}^{i=7} \alpha_i \left( \frac{x}{L_0} \right) ^i$$,

with $\alpha_2 = -0.5164228$, $\alpha_3 = -2.737418$, $\alpha_4 = 16.07497$, $\alpha_5 = -38.87607$, $\alpha_6 = 39.49944$, $\alpha_7 = -14.17718$.

A simple and accurate approximation for the force-extension behavior with about 1% relative error is:

$$\frac {FP} {k_{B}T} = \frac {1}{4} \left ( 1 - \frac {x} {L_0} \right )^{-2} - \frac {1}{4} + \frac {x}{L_0}-0.8 \left (\frac {x} {L_0} \right )^{2.15}$$

Approximation for the extension-force behavior with about 1% relative error was also reported:

$$\frac {x} {L_0} = \frac {4}{3} -  \frac {4} {3\sqrt{\frac {FP} {k_{B}T} + 1}} -\frac {10e^{\sqrt[4]{900\frac {k_{B}T} {FP}}}} {\sqrt{\frac {FP} {k_{B}T}} \left(e^{\sqrt[4]{900\frac {k_{B}T} {FP}}}-1 \right)^{2} } + \frac {\left (\frac {FP} {k_{B}T}\right)^{1.62}} {3.55+3.8\left ( \frac {FP} {k_{B}T}\right)^{2.2}}$$

== Extensible worm-like chain model ==
The elastic response from extension cannot be neglected: polymers elongate due to external forces. This enthalpic compliance is accounted for the material parameter $K_0$, and the system yields the following Hamiltonian for significantly extended polymers:

$H = H_{\rm elastic}+H_{\rm enthalpic}+H_{\rm external} = \frac {1}{2}k_B T \int_{0}^{L_0} P \cdot \left (\frac {\partial ^2\vec r(s) }{\partial s^2}\right )^{2} ds + \frac {1}{2}\frac {K_0}{L_0} x^{2} - xF$,

This expression contains both the entropic term, which describes changes in the polymer conformation, and the enthalpic term, which describes the stretching of the polymer due to the external force. Several approximations for the force-extension behavior have been put forward, depending on the applied external force. These approximations are made for stretching DNA in physiological conditions (near neutral pH, ionic strength approximately 100 mM, room temperature), with stretch modulus around 1000 pN.

For the low-force regime (F < about 10 pN), the following interpolation formula was derived:

$\frac {FP} {k_{B}T} = \frac {1}{4} \left ( 1 - \frac {x} {L_0} + \frac {F}{K_0} \right )^{-2} - \frac {1}{4} + \frac {x}{L_0} - \frac {F}{K_0}$.

For the higher-force regime, where the polymer is significantly extended, the following approximation is valid:

$x = L_0 \left ( 1 - \frac {1} {2} \left ( \frac {k_{B}T}{FP} \right )^{1/2} + \frac {F}{K_0}\right )$.

As for the case without extension, a more accurate formula was derived:

$\frac {FP} {k_{B}T} = \frac {1}{4} \left ( 1 - l \right )^{-2} - \frac {1}{4} + l + \sum_{i=2}^{i=7} \alpha_i \left( l \right) ^i$,

with $l = \frac{x}{L_0} - \frac{F}{K_0}$. The $\alpha_i$ coefficients are the same as the above described formula for the WLC model without elasticity.

Accurate and simple interpolation formulas for the force-extension and extension-force behaviors for the extensible worm-like chain model are:

$$\frac {FP} {k_{B}T} = \frac {1}{4} \left ( 1 - \frac {x} {L_0}+ \frac {F}{K_0} \right )^{-2} - \frac {1}{4} + \frac {x}{L_0} - \frac {F}{K_0}-0.8 \left (\frac {x} {L_0}- \frac {F}{K_0} \right )^{2.15}$$

$$\frac {x} {L_0} = \frac {4}{3} -  \frac {4} {3\sqrt{\frac {FP} {k_{B}T} + 1}} -\frac {10e^{\sqrt[4]{900\frac {k_{B}T} {FP}}}} {\sqrt{\frac {FP} {k_{B}T}} \left(e^{\sqrt[4]{900\frac {k_{B}T} {FP}}}-1 \right)^{2} } + \frac {\left (\frac {FP} {k_{B}T}\right)^{1.62}} {3.55+3.8\left ( \frac {FP} {k_{B}T}\right)^{2.2}} + \frac {F}{K_0}$$

== See also ==
- Ideal chain
- Polymer
- Polymer physics
