= Single-particle tracking =

Principle of single-particle tracking: The rectangles represent frames from an image acquisition at times t = 0, 1, 2, ... The tracked particles are represented as red circles, and in the last frame, the reconstructed trajectories are shown as blue lines

Single-particle tracking (SPT) is the observation of the motion of individual particles within a medium. The coordinates time series, which can be either in two dimensions (x, y) or in three dimensions (x, y, z), is referred to as a trajectory. The trajectory is typically analyzed using statistical methods to extract information about the underlying dynamics of the particle. These dynamics can reveal information about the type of transport being observed (e.g., thermal or active), the medium where the particle is moving, and interactions with other particles. In the case of random motion, trajectory analysis can be used to measure the diffusion coefficient.

== Applications ==
In life sciences, single-particle tracking is broadly used to quantify the dynamics of molecules/proteins in live cells (of bacteria, yeast, mammalian cells and live Drosophila embryos). Single Particle Tracking in living cells was first performed by Elf and colleagues to analyze the dynamics of the lac repressor in E. col. It has since been extensively used to study the transcription factor dynamics in live cells. This method has been extensively used in the last decade to understand the target-search mechanism of proteins in live cells. It addresses fundamental biological questions such as how a protein of interest finds its target in the complex cellular environment? how long does it take to find its target site for binding? what is the residence time of proteins binding to DNA? Recently, SPT has been used to study the kinetics of protein translating and processing in vivo. For molecules which bind large structures such as ribosomes, SPT can be used to extract information about the binding kinetics. As ribosome binding increases the effective size of the smaller molecule, the diffusion rate decreases upon binding. By monitoring these changes in diffusion behavior, direct measurements of binding events are obtained. Furthermore, exogenous particles are employed as probes to assess the mechanical properties of the medium, a technique known as passive microrheology. This technique has been applied to investigate the motion of lipids and proteins within membranes, molecules in the nucleus and cytoplasm, organelles and molecules therein, lipid granules, vesicles, and particles introduced in the cytoplasm or the nucleus. Additionally, single-particle tracking has been extensively used in the study of reconstituted lipid bilayers, intermittent diffusion between 3D and either 2D (e.g., a membrane) or 1D (e.g., a DNA polymer) phases, and synthetic entangled actin networks.

== Methods ==
The most common type of particles used in single particle tracking are based either on scatterers, such as polystyrene beads or gold nanoparticles that can be tracked using bright field illumination, or fluorescent particles. For fluorescent tags, there are many different options with their own advantages and disadvantages, including quantum dots, fluorescent proteins, organic fluorophores, and cyanine dyes.

On a fundamental level, once the images are obtained, single-particle tracking is a two-step process. First the particles are detected and then the localized different particles are connected in order to obtain individual trajectories.

Besides performing particle tracking in 2D, there are several imaging modalities for 3D particle tracking, including multifocal plane microscopy, double helix point spread function microscopy, and introducing astigmatism via a cylindrical lens or adaptive optics.

== See also ==
- Brownian motion
- Diffusion
- Microrheology
- Nanoparticle tracking analysis
- Single-molecule experiment
- Single particle trajectory
- Tethered particle motion
