= Multifocal plane microscopy =

The schematic of a multifocal plane microscope

Multifocal plane microscopy (MUM), also known as multiplane microscopy or multifocus microscopy, is a form of light microscopy that allows the tracking of the 3D dynamics in live cells at high temporal and spatial resolution by simultaneously imaging different focal planes within the specimen. In this methodology, the light collected from the sample by an infinity-corrected objective lens is split into two paths. In each path the split light is focused onto a detector which is placed at a specific calibrated distance from the tube lens. In this way, each detector images a distinct plane within the sample. The first developed MUM setup was capable of imaging two distinct planes within the sample. However, the setup can be modified to image more than two planes by further splitting the light in each light path and focusing it onto detectors placed at specific calibrated distances. It has later been improved for imaging up to four distinct planes. To image a greater number of focal planes, simpler techniques based on image splitting optics have been developed. One example is by using a customized image splitting prism, which is capable of capturing up to 8 focal planes using only two cameras. Better yet, standard off-the-shelf partial beamsplitters can be used to construct a so-called z-splitter prism that allows simultaneous imaging of 9 individual focal planes using a single camera. Another technique called multifocus microscopy (MFM) uses diffractive Fourier optics to image up to 25 focal planes.

== Introduction ==
Fluorescence microscopy of live cells represents a major tool in the study of trafficking events. The conventional microscope design is well adapted to image fast cellular dynamics in two dimensions, i.e., in the plane of focus. However, cells are three-dimensional objects and intracellular trafficking pathways are typically not constrained to one focal plane. If the dynamics are not constrained to one focal plane, the conventional single plane microscopy technology is inadequate for detailed studies of fast intracellular dynamics in three dimensions. Classical approaches based on changing the focal plane are often not effective in such situations since the focusing devices are relatively slow in comparison to many of the intracellular dynamics. In addition, the focal plane may frequently be at the wrong place at the wrong time, thereby missing important aspects of the dynamic events.

=== Implementation ===
MUM can be implemented in any standard light microscope. An example implementation in a Zeiss microscope is as follows. A Zeiss dual-video adaptor is first attached to the side port of a Zeiss Axiovert 200 microscope. Two Zeiss dual-video adaptors are then concatenated by attaching each of them to the output ports of the first Zeiss video adaptor. To each of the concatenated video adaptor, a high resolution CCD camera is attached by using C-mount/spacer rings and a custom-machined camera coupling adaptor. The spacing between the output port of the video adaptor and the camera is different for each camera, which results in the cameras imaging distinct focal planes.

It is worth mentioning that there are many ways to implement MUM. The mentioned implementation offers several advantages such as flexibility, ease of installation and maintenance, and adjustability for different configurations. Additionally, for a number of applications it is important to be able to acquire images in different colors at different exposure times. For example, to visualize exocytosis in TIRFM, very fast acquisition is necessary. However, to image a fluorescently labeled stationary organelle in the cell, low excitation is necessary to avoid photobleaching and as a result the acquisition has to be relatively slow. In this regard, the above implementation offers great flexibility, since different cameras can be used to acquire images in different channels.

== 3D super-resolution imaging and single molecule tracking using MUM ==
A comparison of the depth discrimination of MUM with conventional single plane microscopy

Modern microscopy techniques have generated significant interest in studying cellular processes at the single molecule level. Single molecule experiments overcome averaging effects and therefore provide information that is not accessible using conventional bulk studies. However, the 3D localization and tracking of single molecules poses several challenges. In addition to whether or not images of the single molecule can be captured while it undergoes potentially highly complex 3D dynamics, the question arises whether or not the 3D location of the single molecule can be determined and how accurately this can be done.

A major obstacle to high accuracy 3D location estimation is the poor depth discrimination of a standard microscope. Even with a high numerical aperture objective, the image of a point source in a conventional microscope does not change appreciably if the point source is moved several hundred nanometers from its focus position. This makes it extraordinarily difficult to determine the axial, i.e., z position, of the point source with a conventional microscope.

More generally, quantitative single molecule microscopy for 3D samples poses the identical problem whether the application is localization/tracking or super-resolution microscopy such as PALM, STORM, FPALM, dSTORM for 3D applications, i.e. the determination of the location of a single molecule in three dimensions. MUM offers several advantages. In MUM, images of the point source are simultaneously acquired at different focus levels. These images give additional information that can be used to constrain the z position of the point source. This constraining information largely overcomes the depth discrimination problem near the focus.

The 3D localization measure provides a quantitative measure of how accurately the location of the point source can be determined. A small numerical value of the 3D localization measure implies very high accuracy in determining the location, while a large numerical value of the 3D localization measure implies very poor accuracy in determining the location. For a conventional microscope when the point source is close to the plane of focus, e.g., z0 <= 250 nm, the 3D localization measure predicts very poor accuracy in estimating the z position. Thus, in a conventional microscope, it is problematic to carry out 3D tracking when the point source is close to the plane of focus.

On the other hand, for a two plane MUM setup the 3D localization measure predicts consistently better accuracy than a conventional microscope for a range of z-values, especially when the point source is close to the plane of focus. An immediate implication of this result is that the z-location of the point source can be determined with relatively the same level of accuracy for a range of z-values, which is favorable for 3D single particle tracking.

== Dual objective multifocal plane microscopy (dMUM) ==
Dual objective multifocal plane microscope (dMUM)

In single particle imaging applications, the number of photons detected from the fluorescent label plays a crucial role in the quantitative analysis of the acquired data. Currently, particle tracking experiments are typically carried out on either an inverted or an upright microscope, in which a single objective lens illuminates the sample and also collects the fluorescence signal from it. Note that although fluorescence emission from the sample occurs in all directions (i.e., above and below the sample), the use of a single objective lens in these microscope configurations results in collecting light from only one side of the sample. Even if a high numerical aperture objective lens is used, not all photons emitted at one side of the sample can be collected due to the finite collection angle of the objective lens. Thus even under the best imaging conditions conventional microscopes collect only a fraction of the photons emitted from the sample.

To address this problem, a microscope configuration can be used that uses two opposing objective lenses, where one of the objectives is in an inverted position and the other objective is in an upright position. This configuration is called dual objective multifocal plane microscopy (dMUM).
