= Reptation =

Movement of entangled polymer chains

Reptation is the thermal motion of very long linear macromolecules in entangled polymer melts or concentrated polymer solutions. Derived from the word reptile, reptation suggests the movement of entangled polymer chains as being analogous to snakes slithering through one another. Pierre-Gilles de Gennes introduced (and named) the concept of reptation into polymer physics in 1971 to explain the dependence of the mobility of a macromolecule on its length. Reptation is used as a mechanism to explain viscous flow in an amorphous polymer. Sam Edwards and Masao Doi later refined reptation theory.

Reptation—motion of long linear, entangled macromolecules amorphous polymers.

Two closely related concepts are reptons and entanglement. A repton is a mobile point residing in the cells of a lattice, connected by bonds. Entanglement means the topological restriction of molecular motion by other chains.

== Theory and mechanism ==
Reptation theory describes the effect of polymer chain entanglements on the relationship between molecular mass and chain relaxation time. The theory predicts that, in entangled systems, the relaxation time τ is proportional to the cube of molecular mass, M: τ ∝ M^{3}. The prediction of the theory can be arrived at by a relatively simple argument. First, each polymer chain is envisioned as occupying a tube of length L, through which it may move with snake-like motion (creating new sections of tube as it moves). Furthermore, if we consider a time scale comparable to τ, we may focus on the overall, global motion of the chain. Thus, we define the tube mobility as

μ_{tube} = v / f,

where v is the velocity of the chain when it is pulled by a force, f. μ_{tube} will be inversely proportional to the degree of polymerization (and thus also inversely proportional to chain weight).

The diffusivity of the chain through the tube may then be written as

D_{tube} = k_{B} T μ_{tube}.

By then recalling that in 1-dimension the mean squared displacement due to Brownian motion is given by

s(t)^{2} = 2D_{tube} t,

we obtain

s(t)^{2} = 2k_{B} T μ_{tube} t.

The time necessary for a polymer chain to displace the length of its original tube is then

t = L^{2} / (2k_{B} T μ_{tube}).

By noting that this time is comparable to the relaxation time, we establish that τ ∝ L^{2} / μ_{tube}. Since the length of the tube is proportional to the degree of polymerization, and μ_{tube} is inversely proportional to the degree of polymerization, we observe that τ ∝ (DP_{n})^{3} (and so τ ∝ M^{3}).

From the preceding analysis, we see that molecular mass has a very strong effect on relaxation time in entangled polymer systems. Indeed, this is significantly different from the untangled case, where relaxation time is observed to be proportional to molecular mass. This strong effect can be understood by recognizing that, as chain length increases, the number of tangles present will dramatically increase. These tangles serve to reduce chain mobility. The corresponding increase in relaxation time can result in viscoelastic behavior, which is often observed in polymer melts. Note that the polymer's zero-shear viscosity gives an approximation of the actual observed dependency, τ ∝ M^{3.4}; this relaxation time has nothing to do with the reptation relaxation time.

== Models ==
The blob model, explaining the entanglement of long polymer chains.

The tube model, explaining the basically one-dimensional mobility of long polymer chains.

Entangled polymers are characterized with effective internal scale, commonly known as the length of macromolecule between adjacent entanglements $M_\text{e}$.

Entanglements with other polymer chains restrict polymer chain motion to a thin virtual tube passing through the restrictions. Without breaking polymer chains to allow the restricted chain to pass through it, the chain must be pulled or flow through the restrictions. The mechanism for movement of the chain through these restrictions is called reptation.

In the blob model, the polymer chain is made up of $n$ Kuhn lengths of individual length $l$. The chain is assumed to form blobs between each entanglement, containing $n_\text{e}$ Kuhn length segments in each. The mathematics of random walks can show that the average end-to-end distance of a section of a polymer chain, made up of $n_\text{e}$ Kuhn lengths is $d=l \sqrt{n_\text{e}}$. Therefore if there are $n$ total Kuhn lengths, and $A$ blobs on a particular chain:

$$A = \dfrac{n}{n_\text{e}}$$

The total end-to-end length of the restricted chain $L$ is then:

$$L = Ad = \dfrac{nl\sqrt{n_\text{e}}}{n_\text{e}} = \dfrac{nl}{\sqrt{n_\text{e}}}$$

This is the average length a polymer molecule must diffuse to escape from its particular tube, and so the characteristic time for this to happen can be calculated using diffusive equations. A classical derivation gives the reptation time $t$:

$$t = \dfrac{l^2 n^3 \mu}{n_\text{e} k T}$$

where $\mu$ is the coefficient of friction on a particular polymer chain, $k$ is the Boltzmann constant, and $T$ is the absolute temperature.

The linear macromolecules reptate if the length of macromolecule $M$ is bigger than the critical entanglement molecular weight $M_\text{c}$. $M_\text{c}$ is 1.4 to 3.5 times $M_\text{e}$. There is no reptation motion for polymers with $M < M_\text{c}$, so that the point $M_\text{c}$ is a point of dynamic phase transition.

Due to the reptation motion the coefficient of self-diffusion and conformational relaxation times of macromolecules depend on the length of macromolecule as $M^{-2}$ and $M^3$, correspondingly. The conditions of existence of reptation in the thermal motion of macromolecules of complex architecture (macromolecules in the form of branch, star, comb and others) have not been established yet.

The dynamics of shorter chains or of long chains at short times is usually described by the Rouse model.

== See also ==
- Polymer characterization
- Polymer physics
- Protein dynamics
- Soft matter
