= Persistence length =

Mechanical property that characterizes a polymer

The persistence length is a basic mechanical property quantifying the bending stiffness of a polymer. The molecule behaves like a flexible elastic rod/beam (beam theory). Informally, for pieces of the polymer that are shorter than the persistence length, the molecule behaves like a rigid rod, while for pieces of the polymer that are much longer than the persistence length, the properties can only be described statistically, like a three-dimensional random walk.

Formally, the persistence length, P, is defined as the length over which correlations in the direction of the tangent are lost. In a more chemical-based manner, it can also be defined as the average sum of the projections of all bonds j ≥ i on bond i in an infinitely long chain.

Let us define the angle θ between a vector that is tangent to the polymer at position 0 (zero) and a tangent vector at a distance L away from position 0, along the contour of the chain. It can be shown that the expectation value of the cosine of the angle falls off exponentially with distance,

$$\langle\cos{\theta}\rangle = e^{-(L/P)} \,$$

where P is the persistence length and the angled brackets denote the average over all starting positions.

The persistence length is considered to be one half of the Kuhn length, the length of hypothetical segments that the chain can be considered as freely joined. The persistence length equals the average projection of the end-to-end vector on the tangent to the chain contour at a chain end in the limit of infinite chain length.

The persistence length can be also expressed using the bending stiffness $B_s$, the Young's modulus E and knowing the section of the polymer chain.

$$P=\frac{B_s}{k_BT}\,$$

where $k_B$ is the Boltzmann constant and T is the temperature.

$$B_s=EI\,$$

In the case of a rigid and uniform rod, I can be expressed as:

$$I=\frac{\pi a^4}{4}\,$$

where a is the radius.

For charged polymers the persistence length depends on the surrounding salt concentration due to electrostatic screening. The persistence length of a charged polymer is described by the OSF (Odijk, Skolnick and Fixman) model.

== Examples ==
For example, a piece of uncooked spaghetti has a persistence length on the order of $10^{18}$ m (taking in consideration a Young modulus of 5 GPa and a radius of 1 mm). Double-helical DNA has a persistence length of about 390 ångströms. Such large persistent length for spaghetti does not mean that it is not flexible. It just means that its stiffness is such that it needs $10^{18}$ m of length for thermal fluctuations at 300K to bend it.

Another example:
Imagine a long cord that is slightly flexible. At short distance scales, the cord will basically be rigid. If you look at the direction the cord is pointing at two points that are very close together, the cord will likely be pointing in the same direction at those two points (i.e. the angles of the tangent vectors are highly correlated). If you choose two points on this flexible cord (imagine a piece of cooked spaghetti that you've just tossed on your plate) that are very far apart, however, the tangent to the cords at those locations will likely be pointing in different directions (i.e. the angles will be uncorrelated). If you plot out how correlated the tangent angles at two different points are as a function of the distance between the two points, you'll get a plot that starts out at 1 (perfect correlation) at a distance of zero and drops exponentially as distance increases. The persistence length is the characteristic length scale of that exponential decay. For the case of a single molecule of DNA the persistence length can be measured using optical tweezers and atomic force microscopy.

== Tools for measurement of persistence length ==
Persistence length measurement of single stranded DNA is viable by various tools. Most of them have been done by incorporation of the worm-like chain model. For example, two ends of single stranded DNA were tagged by donor and acceptor dyes to measure average end to end distance which is represented as FRET efficiency. It was converted to persistence length by comparing the FRET efficiency with calculated FRET efficiency based on models such as the worm-like chain model. The recent attempts to obtain persistence length is combination of fluorescence correlation spectroscopy (FCS) with HYDRO program. HYDRO program is simply noted as the upgrade of Stokes–Einstein equation. The Stokes–Einstein equation calculates diffusion coefficient (which is inversely proportional to diffusion time) by assuming the molecules as pure sphere. However, the HYDRO program has no limitation regarding to the shape of molecule. For estimation of single stranded DNA persistence length, the diffusion time of number of worm-like chain polymer was generated and its diffusion time is calculated by the HYDRO program which is compared with the experiment diffusion time of FCS. The polymer property was adjusted to find the optimal persistence length.

== See also ==
- Polymer
- Worm-like chain
- Freely jointed chain
- Kuhn length
- Paul Flory
