= Equilibrium gel =

Viscous liquid with constant consistency

Equilibrium gel is made from a synthetic clay. Unlike other gels, it maintains the same consistency throughout its structure and is stable, which means it does not separate into sections of solid mass and those of more liquid mass. Equilibrium gel filtration liquid chromatography is a technique used for the quantitation of ligand binding.

== Synthesis ==
Illustration of the bonding interaction between clay platelets

The gel is created by suspending synthetic clay in water. The initial fluid transformed into gel after a few months with concentrations of up to 1% clay by weight. After three years the substance separated into two phases. One phase was clay-rich while the other was clay-poor. However, at concentrations above 1% no such phase separation occurred. Unlike the lower concentrations where the arrangement of clay particles was continually in flux, the particles above 1% concentration locked into a stable structure which is known as equilibrium gel.

Clay particles interact in an anisotropic way differing from the typical isotropic way of colloidal particles, which normally interact with all of their nearest neighbors when forming a gel. The clay particles are disc-shaped giving them an asymmetric charge distribution with a net positive charge on their edges and net negative on their faces. This doesn't allow them to interact with their neighbors, and they tend to form T-bonds. This lets clay particles connect in a chain and allows the gel to form at a low density.

== Properties ==
Equilibrium gel is similar to any gel in the way that it is a colloid in which the disperse phase has combined with the dispersion medium to produce a semisolid material. The difference with equilibrium gel is that it will not separate over time into two separate phase like all other gels. In a study taking place over seven years, scientist concluded that colloidal clays at slightly higher concentrations evolved reversibly and continuously from the empty liquid state to an arrested structure. From this observed properties the name equilibrium gel was derived.

Equilibrium gel shares the traits of all soft matter. Soft matter is a conceptual term that can be used to categorize polymers, liquid crystals, colloids, amphiphilic molecules, glass, granular and biological materials. One of the main characteristics of Equilibrium gel as with soft matter is that it displays various mesoscopic structures originating from a large number of internal degrees of freedoms of each molecule.

== Applications ==
Scientists are already coming up with potential applications for equilibrium gel. One such application is batteries containing a gel electrolyte. Producing a relatively high power for a given weight, the battery could be incorporated into microscope devices if the gel could be made at a low enough density.

Equilibrium gel could also be used as coatings to deliver drugs into the body. Using the gel for coatings instead of other substances would be beneficial. This is due to the fact that the gel would allow the coatings to be lighter, thus reducing the amount of material that enters the body. The coatings protect against the bodies immune system and dissolve when the drug reaches its target.
