= Smart gel =

Gel with varying physical properties

Smart gel is a type of smart material.

Smart gel is a functional material that actively changes its volume and properties (hydrophilicity/hydrophobicity) in response to changes in external environments such as temperature, pH, light, and electric fields. They have been suggested for applications such as temperature-responsive recovery of moisture from the air as water, drug delivery systems, and medical biocompatible patches.

== See also ==
- Smart polymer
- Programmable matter
- Sensors
- Actuators
- Artificial muscles
- Thermally induced shape-memory effect (polymers)
- Covalent adaptable networks / Vitrimers
