= Kuhn length =

Idealization in polymer thermodynamics

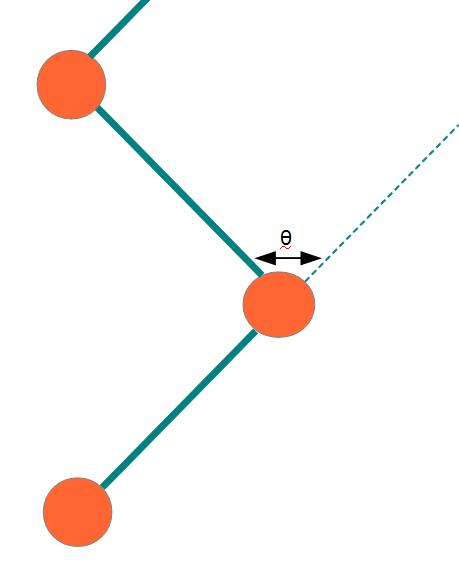
Bond angle

The Kuhn length is a theoretical treatment, developed by Werner Kuhn, in which a real polymer chain is considered as a collection of $N$ Kuhn segments each with a Kuhn length $b$. Each Kuhn segment can be thought of as if they are freely jointed with each other. Each segment in a freely jointed chain can randomly orient in any direction without the influence of any forces, independent of the directions taken by other segments. Instead of considering a real chain consisting of $n$ bonds and with fixed bond angles, torsion angles, and bond lengths, Kuhn considered an equivalent ideal chain with $N$ connected segments, now called Kuhn segments, that can orient in any random direction.

The length of a fully stretched chain is $L=Nb$ for the Kuhn segment chain. In the simplest treatment, such a chain follows the random walk model, where each step taken in a random direction is independent of the directions taken in the previous steps, forming a random coil. The mean square end-to-end distance for a chain satisfying the random walk model is $\langle R^2\rangle = Nb^2$.

Since the space occupied by a segment in the polymer chain cannot be taken by another segment, a self-avoiding random walk model can also be used. The Kuhn segment construction is useful in that it allows complicated polymers to be treated with simplified models as either a random walk or a self-avoiding walk, which can simplify the treatment considerably.

For an actual homopolymer chain (consists of the same repeat units) with bond length $l$ and bond angle θ with a dihedral angle energy potential, the mean square end-to-end distance can be obtained as

$$\langle R^2 \rangle = n l^2 \frac{1+\cos(\theta)}{1-\cos(\theta)} \cdot \frac{1+\langle\cos(\textstyle\phi\,\!)\rangle}{1-\langle\cos (\textstyle\phi\,\!)\rangle}$$,

where $\langle \cos(\textstyle\phi\,\!) \rangle$ is the average cosine of the dihedral angle.

The fully stretched length $L = nl\, \cos(\theta/2)$. By equating the two expressions for $\langle R^2 \rangle$ and the two expressions for $L$ from the actual chain and the equivalent chain with Kuhn segments, the number of Kuhn segments $N$ and the Kuhn segment length $b$ can be obtained.

For worm-like chain, Kuhn length equals two times the persistence length.
