= End-to-end vector =

Vector that points from one end of a polymer to the other

$\vec R$ is the end-to-end vector of the polymer.

In the physical chemistry study of polymers, the end-to-end vector is the vector that points from one end of a polymer to the other end.

If each monomer unit in a polymer is represented by a point in space, the translation vectors $\vec{r}_i$ connect between these points. The end-to-end vector $\vec{R}$ is the sum of these translation vectors:

$$\vec{R} = \sum_i \vec{r}_i$$

The norm of the end-to-end vector is called the end-to-end distance.

== Relation to other quantities ==
The quadratic mean of the end-to-end distance $\left\langle r^2 \right\rangle$ can be related to the quadratic mean of the radius of gyration $\left\langle s^2 \right\rangle$ of a polymer by the relation:

$$\left\langle r^2 \right\rangle = 6 \left\langle s^2 \right\rangle$$

== See also ==
- Freely Jointed Chain
- Worm-like chain
