= Excluded volume =

Concept in polymer physics

The concept of excluded volume was introduced by Werner Kuhn in 1934 and applied to polymer molecules shortly thereafter by Paul Flory. Excluded volume gives rise to depletion forces.

== In liquid state theory ==
In liquid state theory, the 'excluded volume' of a molecule is the volume that is inaccessible to other molecules in the system as a result of the presence of the first molecule. The excluded volume of a hard sphere is eight times its volume—however, for a two-molecule system, this volume is distributed among the two particles, giving the conventional result of four times the volume; this is an important quantity in the Van der Waals equation of state. The calculation of the excluded volume for particles with non-spherical shapes is usually difficult, since it depends on the relative orientation of the particles. The distance of closest approach of hard ellipses and their excluded area has been recently considered.

== In polymer science ==
In polymer science, excluded volume refers to the idea that one part of a long chain molecule can not occupy space that is already occupied by another part of the same molecule. Excluded volume causes the ends of a polymer chain in a solution to be farther apart (on average) than they would be were there no excluded volume (e.g. in case of ideal chain model). The recognition that excluded volume was an important factor in analyzing long-chain molecules in solutions provided an important conceptual breakthrough, and led to the explanation of several puzzling experimental results of the day. It also led to the concept of the theta point, the set of conditions at which an experiment can be conducted that causes the excluded volume effect to be neutralized. At the theta point, the chain reverts to ideal chain characteristics. The long-range interactions arising from excluded volume are eliminated, allowing the experimenter to more easily measure short-range features such as structural geometry, bond rotation potentials, and steric interactions between near-neighboring groups. Flory correctly identified that the chain dimension in polymer melts would have the size computed for a chain in ideal solution if excluded volume interactions were neutralized by experimenting at the theta point.

== See also ==
- Distance of closest approach
- Steric effects
- Mayer f-function
