= Technical performance measure =

United States military engineering metric

Technical performance measures (TPM) is a term used by the US military to refer to key technical goals that needed to be met, where the technical goals were vital for the functioning of a system in its environment.

== Definitions ==
TPM is defined as "the continuing prediction and demonstration of the degree of anticipated or actual achievement of selected technical objectives."

A definition given by Dr. Norman Waks, formerly Director of Defense Research and Engineering in the Office of the Secretary of Defense is as follows:

"... we know that the regular demonstration through test or prediction, extrapolation, or other forecasting technique, of the degree of actual or anticipated achievement of selected technical goals or objectives of a system, component, or equipment project/program and an accounting, in the causal sense, for the difference between the result of this status reading and that which was planned, in a fashion which permits appropriate managers to take timely action on indicated problems."
