= Contour length =

Terminology in molecular physics

Contour length is a term used in molecular physics. The contour length of a polymer chain (a big molecule consisting of many similar smaller molecules) is its length at maximum physically possible extension.

Contour length is equal to the product of the number of segments of polymer molecule(n) and its length(l).
