= Acinetobacter baylyi =

Scientific classification
- Domain: Bacteria
- Kingdom: Pseudomonadati
- Phylum: Pseudomonadota
- Class: Gammaproteobacteria
- Order: Pseudomonadales
- Family: Moraxellaceae
- Genus: Acinetobacter
- Species: A. baylyi

Binomial name
- Acinetobacter baylyi Carr et al. 2003

Species of bacteria

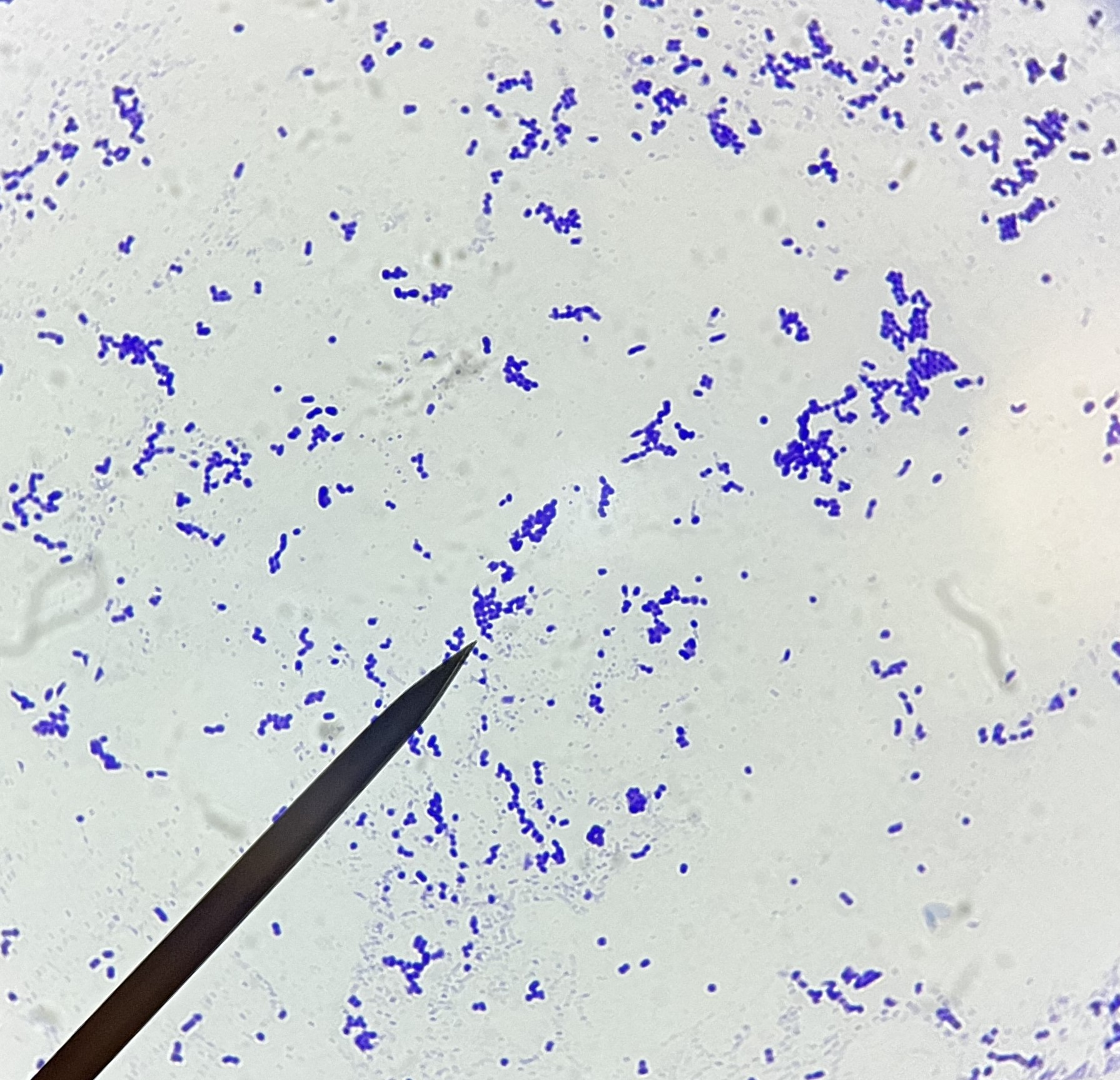
A. baylyi under 10x ocular lens and 100x objective lens with crystal violet stain.

Acinetobacter baylyi is a bacterial species of the genus Acinetobacter. The species designation was given after the characterization of strains isolated from activated sludge in Victoria, Australia, in 2003. A. baylyi is named after the late Dr. Ronald Bayly, an Australian microbiologist who contributed significantly to research on aromatic compound catabolism in diverse bacteria. The new species designation, in 2003, was found to apply to an already well-studied Acinetobacter strain known as ADP1 (previously known as BD413), a derivative of a soil isolate characterized in 1969. For a long time, the taxonomy of Acinetobacter species was complicated by the lack of distinguishing traits. Strain ADP1 was long classified as Acinetobacter calcoaceticus and it was later referred to without a species name (Acinetobacter sp.) Research, particularly in the field of genetics and aromatic compound catabolism, established A. baylyi as a model organism.

Acinetobacter baylyi is a nonmotile, gram-negative coccobacillus. It grows under strictly aerobic conditions, is catalase-positive, nitrate-negative, oxidase-negative, and non-fermentative. The species is naturally competent, meaning the bacteria can take up exogenous DNA from their surroundings. If there is sufficient sequence identity between the transforming DNA and the genome of the recipient, the foreign DNA will be integrated in the chromosome by allelic replacement. The processes of natural transformation and homologous recombination are incredibly efficient in A. baylyi compared to all studied microbes, thus contributing to its experimental utility. There are numerous biotechnology applications for A. baylyi, such as producing alternative fuel sources and chemicals, acting as a host for biosensors to monitor the presence of important compounds, and aiding in degradation of pollutants.

== Genetics ==
One major characteristic of A. baylyi is its ability to take in free DNA from the environment by natural transformation. A mechanism that incorporates exogenous DNA into its genome. The genome of A. baylyi has been completely sequenced, and roughly 35% of A. baylyi's genome sequence encodes proteins that contribute to transformation and recombination . If there are complementary sequences upstream and downstream of the exogenous DNA, A. baylyi can perform recombination. This mechanism strongly depends on A. baylyi's DNA strand break-repair system to ensure success of DNA sequence exchange. The capability of A. baylyi to take in DNA from the environment may have evolved because it provides benefits for survival. This also makes A. baylyi an ideal microbe for laboratory experiments. Multiple single-gene deletion mutations on dispensable genes of the ADP1 strain have been collected. With the knowledge of the entire genome sequence and the mutants, scientists are able to predict how the ADP1 strain will function in different situations, which expands the capability of the strain for industrial and environmental applications.

A. baylyi, like other organisms, can undergo gene duplication and amplification (GDA) mutations. These GDA mutations, which are a form of spontaneous mutations that result in gene copies in the genome, are important for major processes such as evolution, disease, cancer, and antibiotic resistance. However, this type of mutation is difficult to study. The natural transformation system of A. baylyi provides a unique method for studying GDA mutations, making it a model system for understanding this type of genetic process.

=== Horizontal gene transfer and cell surface structure ===
A. baylyi is a non-motile bacterium that does not have flagella. However, these bacteria possess a type IV pili (T4P) that aid in several cellular functions, such as protein secretions, surface sensing, and horizontal gene transfer (HGT). The T4P of A. baylyi has been studied in recent literature, and has been said to depend on the PilB and TfpB motors.

Additionally, A. baylyi's ability to perform HGT may be aided by the presences of outer membrane vesicles (OMVs). OMVs are produced via vesiculation, which is the bulging of the outer membrane followed by the constriction and release of small, spherical structures from the bacterium. These vesicles are composed of various periplasmic components, including proteins, lipids, and genetic information. OMVs play a significant role in intracellular communication, virulence/bacterial defenses, and adaptations to environmental changes. OMVs released by A. baylyi offer a type of gene transfer that is not susceptible to degradation by nucleases. However, environmental stressors can impact the efficiency of these OMVs, including the amount of vesicles released, genetic content, and HGT abilities.

A. baylyi strains have also been associated with bacterial adhesion and biofilm formation. Biofilms arise from the aggregation of surface microbial cells enveloped within a matrix of extracellular polymeric substances. The biofilms of Acinetobacter species can range in adhesion strength and thickness. Acinetobacter baumannii is the species most commonly associated with infectious diseases, including cystic fibrosis and urinary tract infections, due to their ability to adhere to medical devices composed of plastic or glass. It has been found that fimbrial-biogenesis genes and putative surface proteins may be significant to biofilm formation within the Acinetobacter species.

== Metabolism ==
A. baylyi has been used to study many biochemical pathways, since it is metabolically versatile, it grows rapidly, and is easily cultured. A. baylyi can be cultured in media containing diverse carbon sources such as succinate, pyruvate, acetate, ethanol, and many aromatic compounds. A. baylyi is omnipresent in nature and is found in a wide variety of terrestrial and aqueous environments. Organic growth substrates are oxidized to compounds that can enter the citric acid cycle, also known as the tricarboxylic acid (TCA) cycle. A. baylyi's genome was sequenced and its genes annotated to further describe its metabolic properties, aiding its ability to act as a model for metabolic studies.

A. baylyi has long been a model organism for studying the microbial consumption of these compounds. Aromatic compounds are catabolized through the β-ketoadipate pathway, a pathway by which many different aromatic compounds are converted into either catechol or protocatechuate, which serve as substrates for an aromatic ring-opening dioxygenase. Parallel multi-step pathways yield succinyl-CoA and acetyl-CoA after the ring cleavage of catechol or protocatechuate.

The bacterium lacks a sugar phosphotransferase system (PTS) for glucose uptake and phosphorylation, and pyruvate kinase, a vital enzyme in glycolysis that produces pyruvate from phosphoenolpyruvate. When glucose is readily available, A. baylyi can metabolize glucose by first oxidizing it into gluconate, which then enters the Entner-Doudoroff pathway. Without pyruvate kinase, A. baylyi can produces pyruvate from the cleavage of 2-keto-3-deoxy-6-phosphogluconate. Additional pyruvate is produced from the enzymatic conversion of phosphoenolpyruvate to oxalacetate, then malate, and then pyruvate.

Unlike other bacteria that can predominantly use L-amino acids, A. baylyi is able to use D-aspartate, as well as L-aspartate, as both a primary carbon and nitrogen source, thus leading scientists to study how D-enantiomers can be used for bacterial growth.

A. baylyi uses intracellular arginine to produce a biodegradable alternative to petroleum-based plastics known as polyaspartic acid. A. baylyi uses arginine to first produce cyanophycin polypeptides, a transient source of nitrogen, which can then be converted to polyaspartic acid. Cyanophycin is predominantly formed when nitrogen sources are low, and nitrogen is released by cyanophycinase when environmental nitrogen is limited.

== Applications ==
Acinetobacter baylyi, a highly adaptable soil-based microbe isolated from diverse environments such as oil-contaminated soils, river waters, activated sludge, and lignocellulosic biomass. It can survive in polluted environments, degrade aromatic compounds and aliphatic substrates, perform horizontal gene transfer (HGT), and undergo genetic modification has made it a versatile tool in environmental remediation, biotechnology, and synthetic biology.

A. baylyi is a model organism in biotechnology due to its natural competency for DNA transformation and its ability to produce value-added compounds. For example, this bacterium demonstrates potential for lignin bioconversion, converting this challenging plant polymer into valuable biofuels and bioproducts, contributing to sustainable resource utilization. Useful compounds that can be produced by A. baylyi include triacylglycerols (TAGs) and wax esters, compounds essential for industries like cosmetics, oleochemicals, and biofuels. Genetic modifications enhance its efficiency in nitrogen-rich environments, redirecting carbon flow to produce TAGs and wax esters.

Another compound produced by A. baylyi that has commercial value is emulsan, a biosurfactant effective at mixing with hydrophobic substances such as oil. Emulsan reduces oil viscosity, aiding transport and degradation processes, and has applications in cleaning and industrial oil management. Its non-toxic properties make it an ideal alternative to synthetic surfactants for environmental remediating oil spills and addressing other forms of environmental contamination.

A. baylyi has been developed as a sophisticated detector of tumor DNA. It has been used as a biosensor for DNA sequences and mutations. A. baylyi can integrate DNA characteristic of colorectal cancer (CRC) cells and tumors. A. baylyi was engineered using CRISPR-discriminated horizontal gene transfer (CATCH). This innovative application does not require donor cassettes for detection and offers a modular framework for targeting specific DNA sequences, including oncogenic mutations. The biosensors hold potential for non-invasive diagnostics, providing a viable alternative to invasive procedures like colonoscopies. Although not yet ready for clinical use, these biosensors demonstrate advantages over traditional in vitro DNA analysis by capturing and preserving DNA in situ, avoiding degradation by gastrointestinal DNases. Future developments aim to enhance their signal-to-background ratio and improve biocontainment to minimize risks such as antibiotic resistance spread. Additionally, the ability to couple DNA detection with therapeutic delivery systems, such as nanobodies and peptides, presents exciting possibilities for disease management.

A. baylyi's natural transformation abilities have been employed to monitor environmental pollution through engineered biosensors that respond to specific pollutants with bioluminescence. These biosensors can detect contaminants in real time, enabling the tracking of degradation processes in soil and water. This application highlights A. baylyi's potential as a powerful tool for ecological monitoring and environmental remediation.

Similarly, natural transformation contributes to using A. baylyi to detect antibiotic resistance genes acquired through horizontal gene transfer. Research on lettuce plants revealed that A. baylyi can incorporate and transfer resistance genes from the plant surface into internal tissues. These findings highlight its utility as a model organism for studying gene transfer in agricultural and environmental systems and its potential implications for managing antibiotic resistance.
