= CPHA =

CPHA or CPhA may refer to:

- Canadian Pharmacists Association
- Cyanophycin synthase (L-aspartate-adding), an enzyme
- Cyanophycin synthase (L-arginine-adding), an enzyme
