= Poly(N-isopropylacrylamide) =

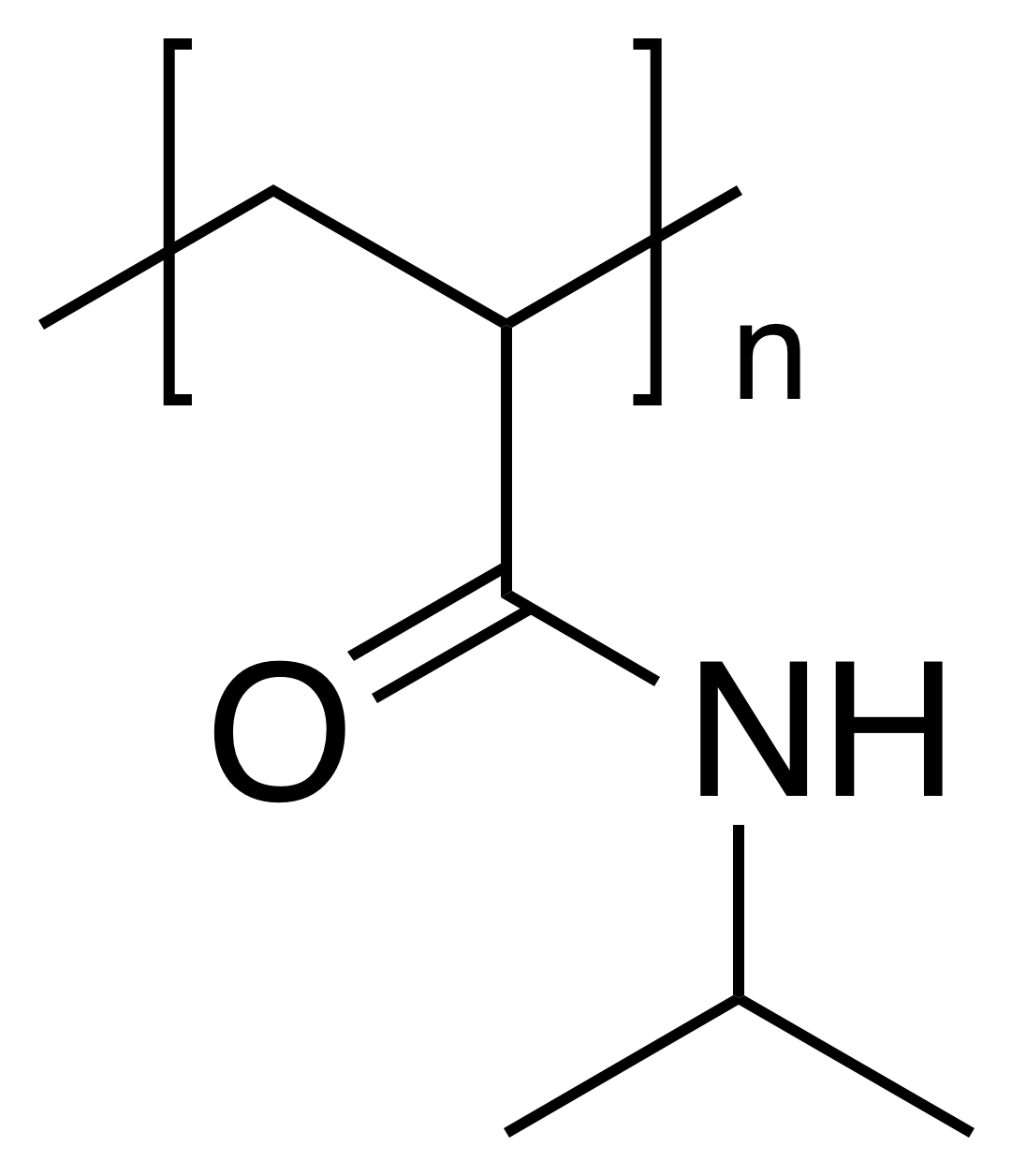

Identifiers
CAS Number	25189-55-3
ChemSpider	none
PubChem CID	16637
CompTox Dashboard (EPA)	DTXSID101011085

Properties
Chemical formula	(C_{6}H_{11}NO)_{n}
Molar mass	variable
Appearance	white solid
Density	1.1 g/cm^{3}
Melting point	96 °C (205 °F; 369 K)

Hazards
NFPA 704 (fire diamond)	0 0 0
Safety data sheet (SDS)	External MSDS
- Except where otherwise noted, data are given for materials in their standard state (at 25 °C [77 °F], 100 kPa). Infobox references

Poly(N-isopropylacrylamide) (variously abbreviated PNIPA, PNIPAM, PNIPAAm, NIPA, PNIPAA or PNIPAm) is a temperature-responsive polymer that was first synthesized in the 1950s. It can be synthesized from N-isopropylacrylamide which is commercially available. It is synthesized via free-radical polymerization and is readily functionalized making it useful in a variety of applications.

PNIPA dissolves in water, however, when these solutions are heated in above their cloud point temperature, they undergo a reversible lower critical solution temperature (LCST) phase transition from a soluble hydrated state to an insoluble dehydrated state. Although it is widely believed that this phase transition occurs at 32 °C (90 °F), the actual temperatures may differ 5 to 10 °C (or even more) depending on the polymer concentration, molar mass of polymer chains, polymer dispersity as well as terminal moieties. Furthermore, other molecules in the polymer solution, such as salts or proteins, can alter the cloud point temperature.

Since PNIPA expels its liquid contents at a temperature near that of the human body, PNIPA copolymers have been investigated by many researchers for possible applications in tissue engineering and controlled drug delivery.

== History ==
The synthesis of poly(N-isopropylacrylamide) began with the synthesis of the acrylamide monomer by Sprecht in 1956. In 1957, Shearer patented the first application for what would be later identified as PNIPA for the use as a rodent repellent. Early work was piqued by theoretical curiosity of the material properties of PNIPA. The first report of PNIPA came in 1968, which elucidated the unique thermal behavior in aqueous solutions. The 1980s marked an explosion in interest in PNIPAs with the realization of potential applications due to its unique thermal behavior in aqueous solutions.

== Chemical and Physical Properties ==
PNIPA is one of the most studied thermosensitive hydrogel. In dilute solution, it undergoes a coil-to-globule transition. PNIPA possesses an inverse solubility upon heating. It changes hydrophilicity and hydrophobicity abruptly at its LCST. At lower temperatures PNIPA orders itself in solution in order to hydrogen bond with the already arranged water molecules. The water molecules must reorient around the nonpolar regions of PNIPA which results in a decreased entropy. At lower temperatures, such as room temperature, the negative enthalpy term ($\Delta H$) from hydrogen bonding effects dominates the Gibbs free energy,
$$\Delta G = \Delta H - T \Delta S \,$$
causing the PNIPA to absorb water and dissolve in solution. At higher temperatures, the entropy term ($\Delta S$) dominates, causing the PNIPA to release water and phase separate which can be seen in the following demonstration.

Pictorial Depiction of the LCST Effect of PNIPA
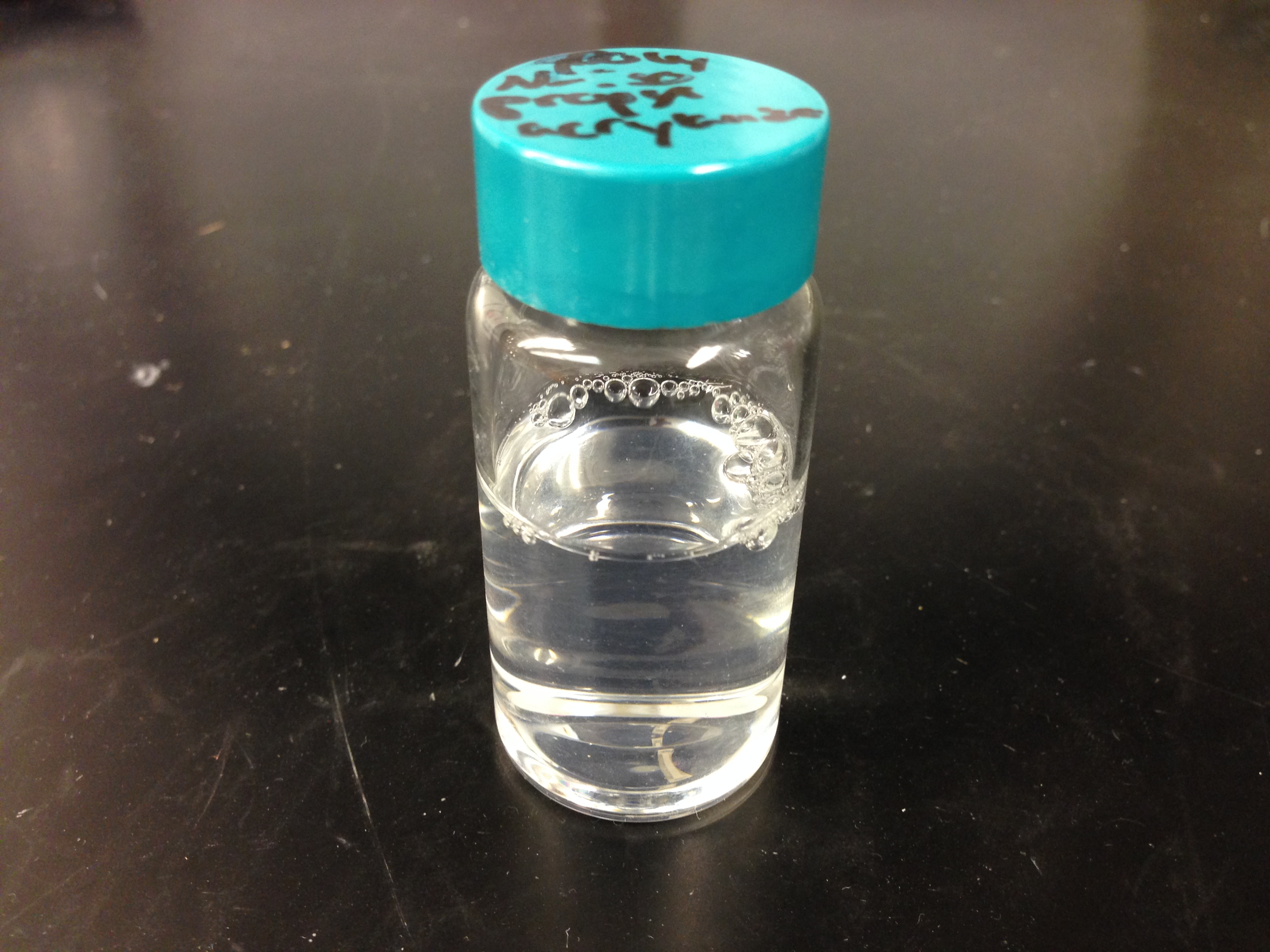
Aqueous solution of PNIPA before heating. The negative enthalpy of hydrogen bonding dominates and PNIPA is dissolved in the solution.

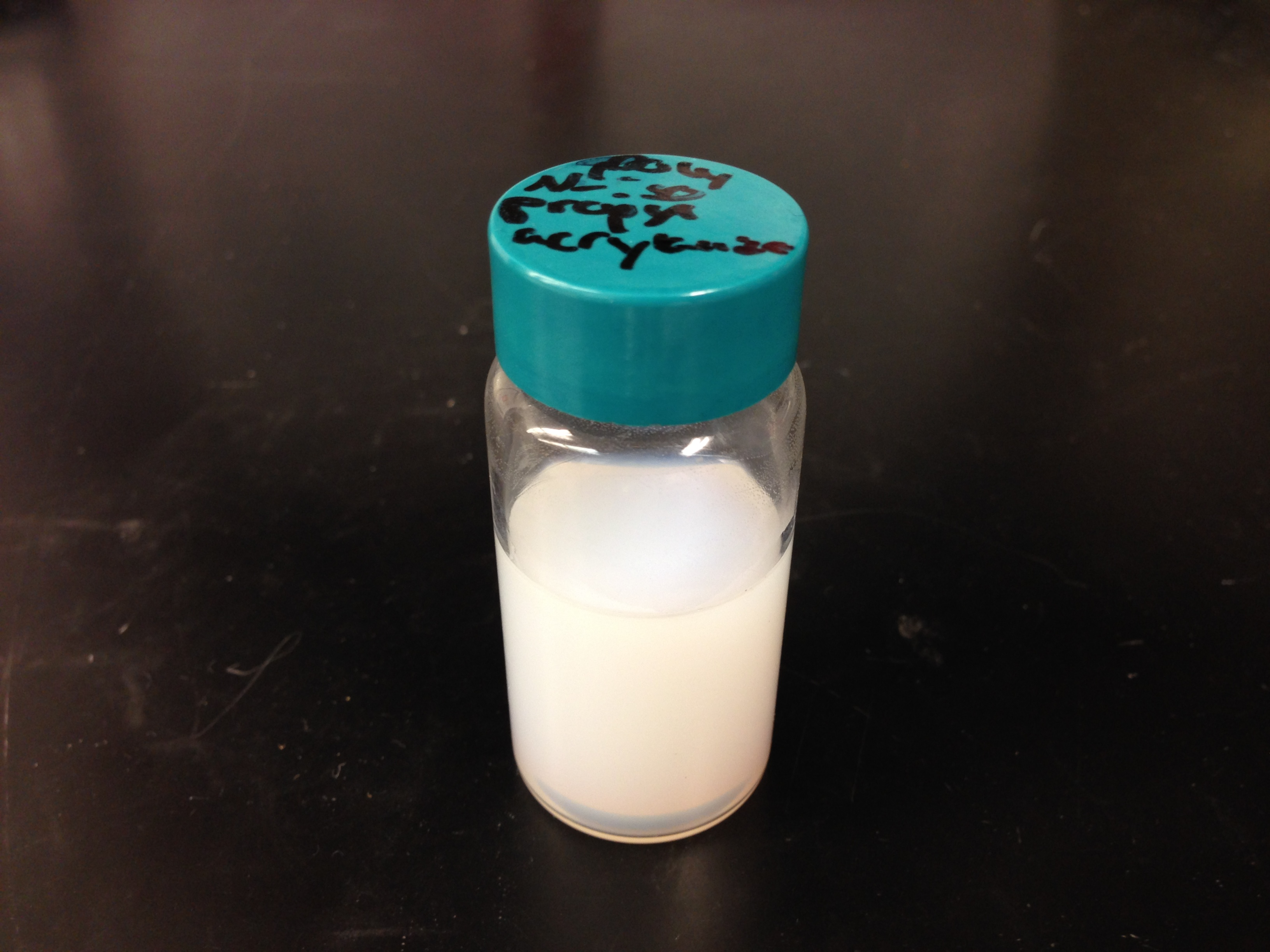
The mixture after heating with a heat gun. The negative entropy of mixing dominates due to the increase in temperature and PNIPA phase separates from the water.

A demonstration of the heating of PNIPA to demonstrate the LCST effect.

== Synthesis of Heat and pH Sensitive PNIPA ==
Homopolymerization

The process of free radical polymerization of a single type of monomer, in this case, N-isopropylacrylamide, to form the polymer is known as a homopolymerization. The radical initiator azobisisobutyronitrile (AIBN) is commonly used in radical polymerizations.
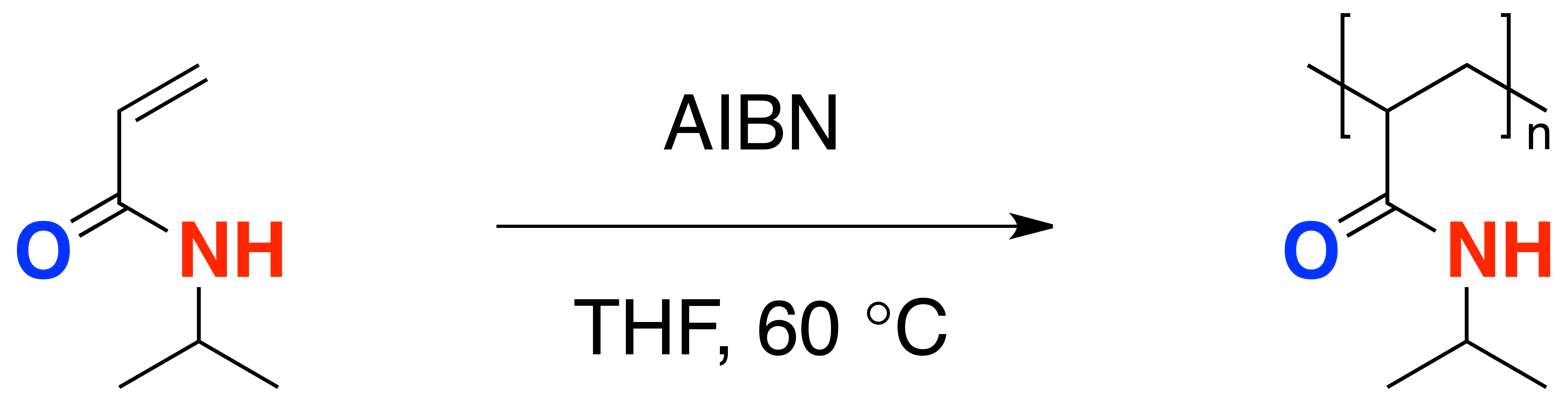

Copolymerization

A free-radical polymerization of two different monomer results in a copolymerization. An advantage to a copolymerization includes fine tuning of the LCST.
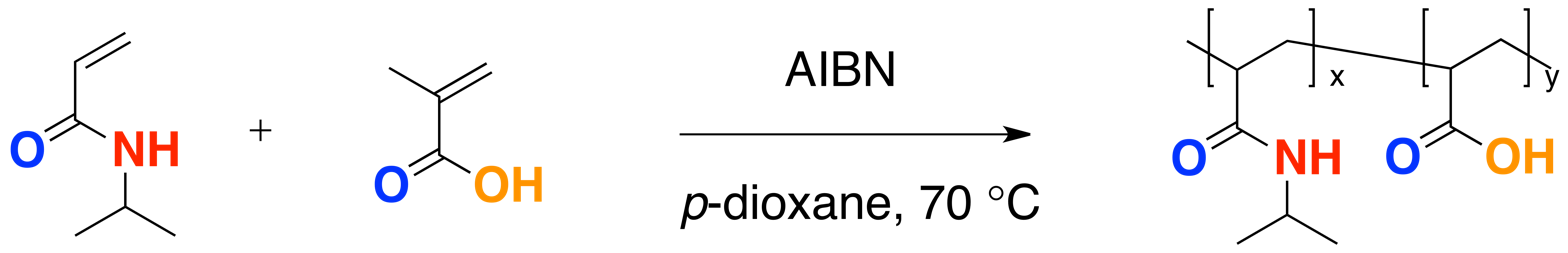

Terpolymerization

A free-radical polymerization of three different monomer is known as a terpolymerization. Advantages to a terpolymerization may include enhancing multiple properties of the polymer including thermosensitivity, pH sensitivity or fine tuning of the LCST.
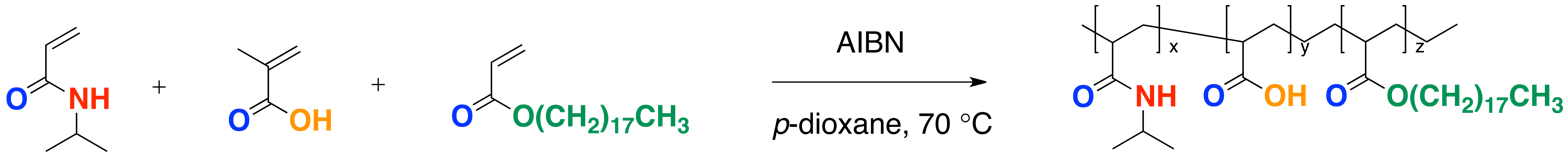

Cross-linked Hydrogel

The reaction scheme below is a terpolymerization to form a cross-linked hydrogel. The reactant ammonium persulfate (APS) is used in polymer chemistry as a strong oxidizing agent that is often used along with tetramethylethylenediamine (TMEDA) to catalyze the polymerization when making polyacrylamide gels.
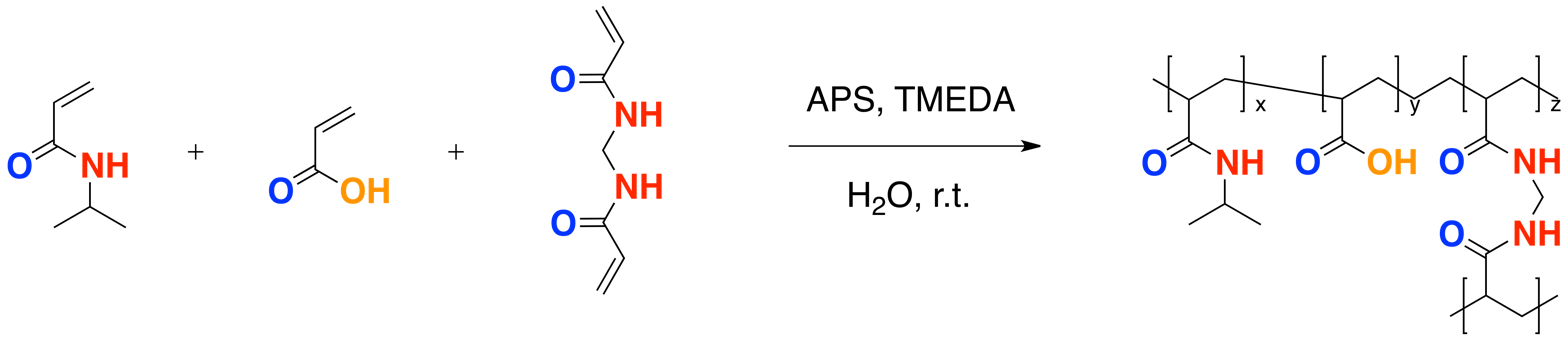

== Synthesis of Chain-End Functionalized PNIPA ==
PNIPA can be functionalized using chain transfer agents using a free radical polymerization. The three schemes below demonstrate functionalization using chain transfer agents (CTA), where one end of the polymer is the radical initiator and the other is a functionalized group. Functionalization of the polymer chain-end allows for the polymer to be used in many diverse settings and applications. Advantages to a functionalizing the chain-end may include enhancing multiple properties of the polymer including thermosensitivity, pH sensitivity or fine tuning of the LCST.

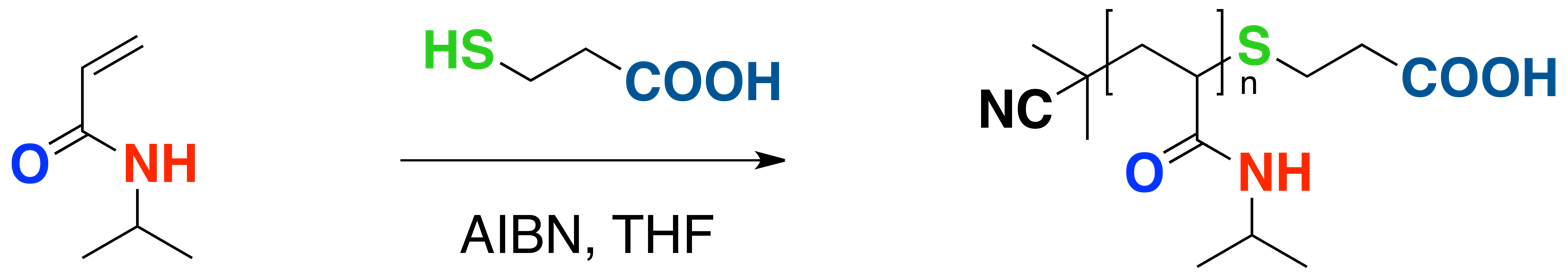
(1)

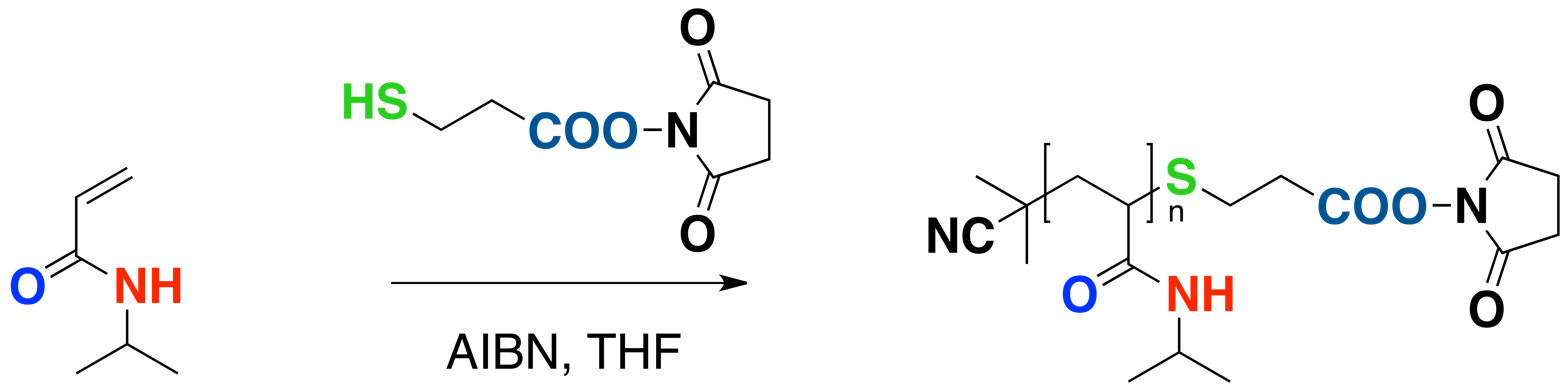
(2)

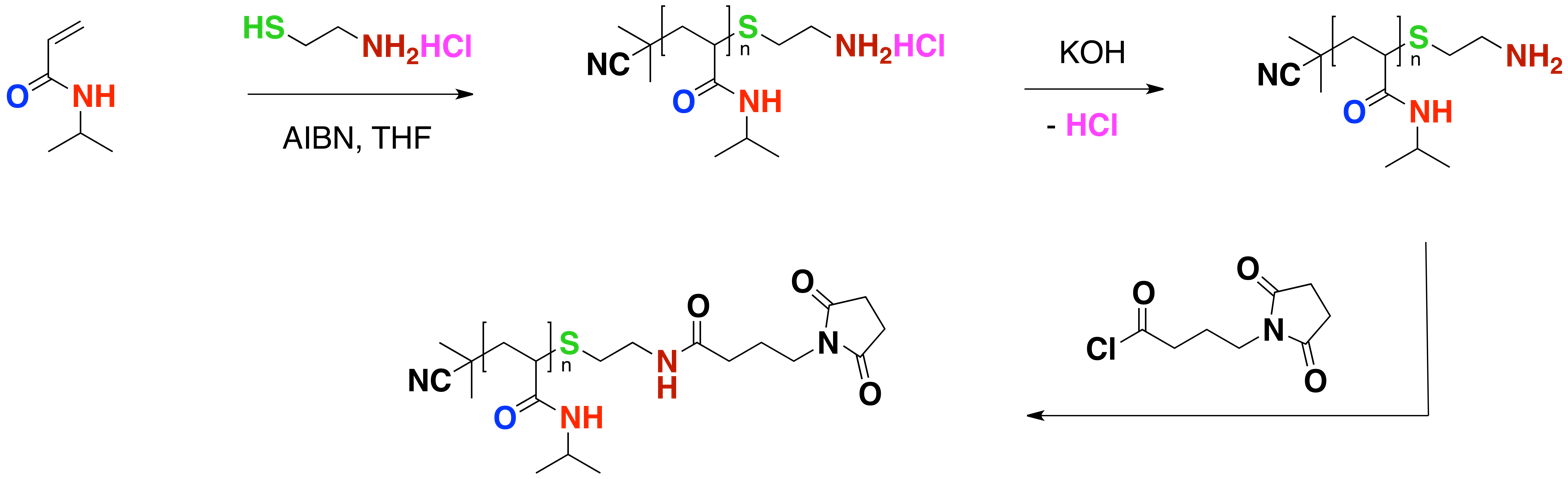
(3)

== Applications ==
The versatility of PNIPA has led to finding uses in macroscopic gels, microgels, membranes, sensors, biosensors, thin films, tissue engineering, and drug delivery. The tendency of aqueous solutions of PNIPA to increase in viscosity in the presence of hydrophobic molecules has made it excellent for tertiary oil recovery.

As aqueous solutions of PNIPA have their lower critical solution temperature in temperatures around human body temperatures, these polymers can be dissolved in water at room temperature and administered into body. However, upon the administration, these polymers phase-separate and form insoluble aggregates at site of administration (this process is called thermogelling). When PNIPA is administered into muscles of mice, its half-life was approximately 48 days (M_{w} = 20 kg/mol) and 66 days (M_{w} = 32 kg/mol) and caused no local or systemic pathologies. Such phase separated hydrogels can be used for local drug delivery applications. The PNIPA can be placed in a solution of bioactive molecules, which allows the bioactive molecules to penetrate the PNIPA. The PNIPA can then be placed in vivo, where there is a rapid release of biomolecules due to the initial gel collapse and an ejection of the biomolecules into the surrounding media, followed by a slow release of biomolecules due to surface pore closure.

PNIPA have also been used in pH-sensitive drug delivery systems. Some examples of these drug delivery systems may include the intestinal delivery of human calcitonin, delivery of insulin, and the delivery of ibuprofen. When radiolabeled PNIPA copolymers with different molecular weights were intravenously injected to rats, it was found that the glomerular filtration threshold of the polymer was around 32 000 g/mol.

PNIPA have been used in gel actuators, which convert external stimuli into mechanical motion. Upon heating above the LCST, the hydrogel goes from hydrophilic to hydrophobic state. This conversion results in an expulsion of water which causes a physical conformational change, creating a mechanical hinge movement.

Furthermore, PNIPA-based thin films can be applied as nano-switches featuring multiple distinct thin-film states, which is based on the cononsolvency effect.
