= Cononsolvency =

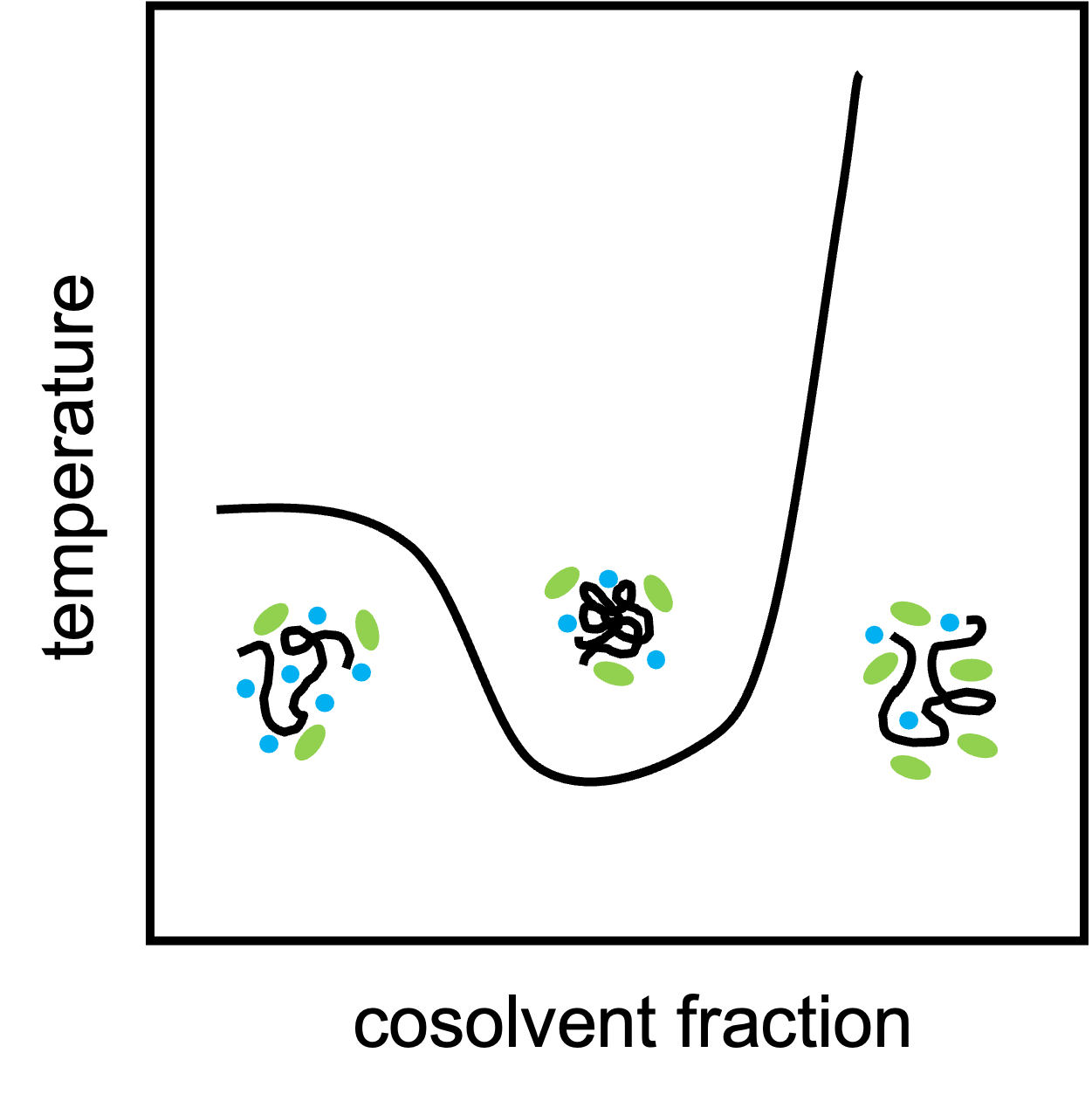
Schematic representation of the cononsolvency effect of a polymer in mixed solution.

Cononsolvency is a phenomenon where two solvents that can typically readily dissolve a polymer, when mixed, at certain ratios of these two solvents, are no longer able to dissolve the polymer. This phenomenon is in contrast to cosolvency where two solvents that are both poor at dissolving a material, but when the two poor solvents admixed, can form a mixed solvent capable of dissolving the material.

The first works of both experimental and theoretical about the cononsolvency effect were published in the late 1970s. Since then, numerous studies focused on a manifold of different polymers that featured the cononsolvency effect in water and various organic cosolvents such as methanol, ethanol, and acetone. Typically poly(acrylamide)s such as poly(N-isopropylacrylamide) show the cononsolvency effect, while this effect is also known for other homopolymers and for more complex systems e.g., diblock copolymer, polyelectrolytes, crosslinked microgels, micelles, and grafted polymer brushes. Recently, it was also shown that thermo-responsive thin films exhibit the cononsolvency effect in a mixed solvent vapor phase, which can be explained by a decreased volume phase transition temperature, the thin-film analogy of a lower critical solution temperature. These experimental studies are supported by a growing number of simulation studies.

After 45 years of research, the origin of the molecular mechanism behind the cononsolvency effect in a mixture of solvents remains not fully resolved yet. To date, researchers have considered various interactions between polymer and solvent/cosolvent as possible factors leading to the cononsolvency effect, such as competitive hydrogen bonding of the solvent and cosolvent with the polymer, hydrophobic hydration of particular functional groups of the polymer, cosolvent induced geometric frustration, excluded-volume interactions due to the surfactant-like behavior of amphiphilic cosolvents, as well as the three body effects, i.e., temporary bridging of one or more individual polymer chains by the cosolvent.

In literature, cononsolvency was reported almost exclusively for polymers in aqueous solution. This, however, does not mean that cononsolvency cannot happen in non-aqueous solutions. For example, poly(methyl methacrylate) shows the cononsolvency effect in the binary mixtures of two organic solvents (chlorobutane and amyl acetate).
