= Cyanophycin synthase (L-arginine-adding) =

Class of enzymes

Identifiers
- EC no.: 6.3.2.30
- CAS no.: 131554-17-1

Databases
- IntEnz: IntEnz view
- BRENDA: BRENDA entry
- ExPASy: NiceZyme view
- KEGG: KEGG entry
- MetaCyc: metabolic pathway
- PRIAM: profile
- PDB structures: RCSB PDB PDBe PDBsum
Search
- PMC: articles
- PubMed: articles
- NCBI: proteins

Cyanophycin synthase (L-arginine-adding) (EC 6.3.2.30, CphA, CphA1, CphA2, cyanophycin synthetase, multi-L-arginyl-poly-L-aspartate synthase) is an enzyme with systematic name cyanophycin:L-arginine ligase (ADP-forming). This enzyme catalyses the following chemical reaction:

ATP + [L-Asp(4-L-Arg)]_{n}-L-Asp + L-Arg $\rightleftharpoons$ ADP + phosphate + [L-Asp(4-L-Arg)]_{n + 1}

This enzyme requires Mg^{2+} for activity. This enzyme requires Mg^{2+} for activity. All enzymes known to have this activity also catalyze the addition of aspartate, i.e. cyanophycin synthase (L-aspartate-adding) activity. It is structurally similar to Muramyl ligases.
