= UDP-N-acetylmuramoyl-L-alanine—D-glutamate ligase =

Class of enzymes

Identifiers
- EC no.: 6.3.2.9
- CAS no.: 9023-59-0

Databases
- IntEnz: IntEnz view
- BRENDA: BRENDA entry
- ExPASy: NiceZyme view
- KEGG: KEGG entry
- MetaCyc: metabolic pathway
- PRIAM: profile
- PDB structures: RCSB PDB PDBe PDBsum
- Gene Ontology: AmiGO / QuickGO
Search
- PMC: articles
- PubMed: articles
- NCBI: proteins

In enzymology, a UDP-N-acetylmuramoyl-L-alanine—D-glutamate ligase (EC 6.3.2.9) is an enzyme that catalyzes the chemical reaction

ATP + UDP-N-acetylmuramoyl-L-alanine + D-glutamate $\rightleftharpoons$ ADP + phosphate + UDP-N-acetylmuramoyl-L-alanyl-D-glutamate

The 3 substrates of this enzyme are ATP, UDP-N-acetylmuramoyl-L-alanine, and D-glutamate, whereas its 3 products are ADP, phosphate, and UDP-N-acetylmuramoyl-L-alanyl-D-glutamate.

This enzyme belongs to the family of ligases, specifically those forming carbon-nitrogen bonds as acid-D-amino-acid ligases (peptide synthases). The systematic name of this enzyme class is UDP-N-acetylmuramoyl-L-alanine:D-glutamate ligase (ADP-forming). Other names in common use include MurD synthetase, UDP-N-acetylmuramoyl-L-alanyl-D-glutamate synthetase, uridine diphospho-N-acetylmuramoylalanyl-D-glutamate synthetase, D-glutamate-adding enzyme, D-glutamate ligase, UDP-Mur-NAC-L-Ala:D-Glu ligase, UDP-N-acetylmuramoyl-L-alanine:glutamate ligase (ADP-forming), and UDP-N-acetylmuramoylalanine-D-glutamate ligase. This enzyme participates in d-glutamine and d-glutamate metabolism and peptidoglycan biosynthesis.

== Structural studies ==
As of late 2007, 9 structures have been solved for this class of enzymes, with PDB accession codes 1E0D, 1EEH, 1UAG, 2JFF, 2JFG, 2JFH, 2UAG, 3UAG, and 4UAG.

== See also ==
- Muramyl ligase
