= Antonino Borzì =

Italian botanist (1852–1921)

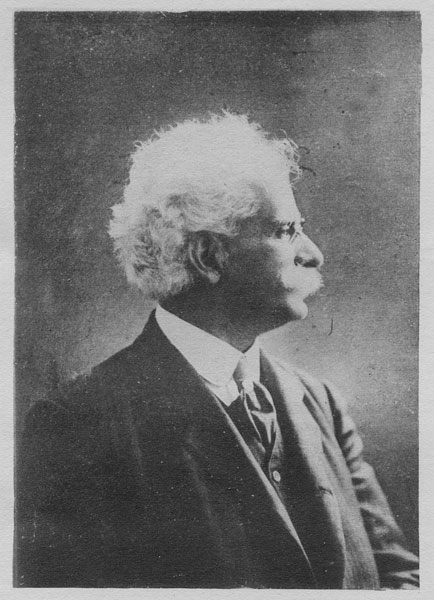
Antonino Borzì

Antonino Borzì (20 August 1852, in Castroreale – 24 August 1921, in Lucca) was an Italian botanist.

== Life and career ==
Antonino Borzì became a professor of botany at the University of Palermo in 1879 and at the University of Messina in 1892. In 1889 he was involved in reestablishing the Orto Botanico "Pietro Castelli" dell'Università di Messina. From 1892 to 1921 he was director of Orto botanico di Palermo.

Antonino Borzì was the first who described the biopolymer cyanophycin in 1887.

== Works (selection) ==
- Studi algologici: saggio di richerche sulla biologia delle alghe. Messina, 1883–1894
- Contribuzioni alla biologia vegetale. Palermo, 1894–1909
- Compendio della flora forestale Italiana: prontuario per la sollecita determinizaione delle pianti forestali indigene all'italia ad uso degli agenti dell'amministrazione dei boschi. Messina, 1885
- Rhizomyxa: Nuovo Ficomicete: Richerche. Messina, 1884
- Le communicazioni intracellulari delle nostochinee. Messina, 1886
- Cultura delle piante da gomma elastica. Palermo, 1905
- Ricerche sulla disseminazione delle piante per mezzo di sauri. Rome, 1911
- Vita, forme, evoluzione nel Regno vegetale. 1915
- Studi sulla Flora o sulla vita delle piante in Libia. Palermo, 1917
- Problemi di filosofia botanica. Rome, 1920
