= UDP-N-acetylmuramate—L-alanine ligase =

Class of enzymes

Identifiers
- EC no.: 6.3.2.8
- CAS no.: 9023-52-3

Databases
- IntEnz: IntEnz view
- BRENDA: BRENDA entry
- ExPASy: NiceZyme view
- KEGG: KEGG entry
- MetaCyc: metabolic pathway
- PRIAM: profile
- PDB structures: RCSB PDB PDBe PDBsum
- Gene Ontology: AmiGO / QuickGO
Search
- PMC: articles
- PubMed: articles
- NCBI: proteins

In enzymology, a UDP-N-acetylmuramate—L-alanine ligase (EC 6.3.2.8) is an enzyme that catalyzes the chemical reaction

ATP + UDP-N-acetylmuramate + L-alanine $\rightleftharpoons$ ADP + phosphate + UDP-N-acetylmuramoyl-L-alanine

The 3 substrates of this enzyme are ATP, UDP-N-acetylmuramate, and L-alanine, whereas its 3 products are ADP, phosphate, and UDP-N-acetylmuramoyl-L-alanine.

This enzyme belongs to the family of ligases, specifically those forming carbon-nitrogen bonds as acid-D-amino-acid ligases (peptide synthases). The systematic name of this enzyme class is UDP-N-acetylmuramate:L-alanine ligase (ADP-forming). Other names in common use include MurC synthetase, UDP-N-acetylmuramoyl-L-alanine synthetase, uridine diphospho-N-acetylmuramoylalanine synthetase, UDP-N-acetylmuramoylalanine synthetase, L-alanine-adding enzyme, UDP-acetylmuramyl-L-alanine synthetase, UDPMurNAc-L-alanine synthetase, L-Ala ligase, uridine diphosphate N-acetylmuramate:L-alanine ligase, uridine 5'-diphosphate-N-acetylmuramyl-L-alanine synthetase, uridine-diphosphate-N-acetylmuramate:L-alanine ligase, UDP-MurNAc:L-alanine ligase, alanine-adding enzyme, and UDP-N-acetylmuramyl:L-alanine ligase. This enzyme participates in d-glutamine and d-glutamate metabolism and peptidoglycan biosynthesis.

== Structural studies ==
As of late 2007, 6 structures have been solved for this class of enzymes, with PDB accession codes 1GQQ, 1GQY, 1J6U, 1P31, 1P3D, and 2F00.

== See also ==
- Muramyl ligase
