= Polyaspartic acid =

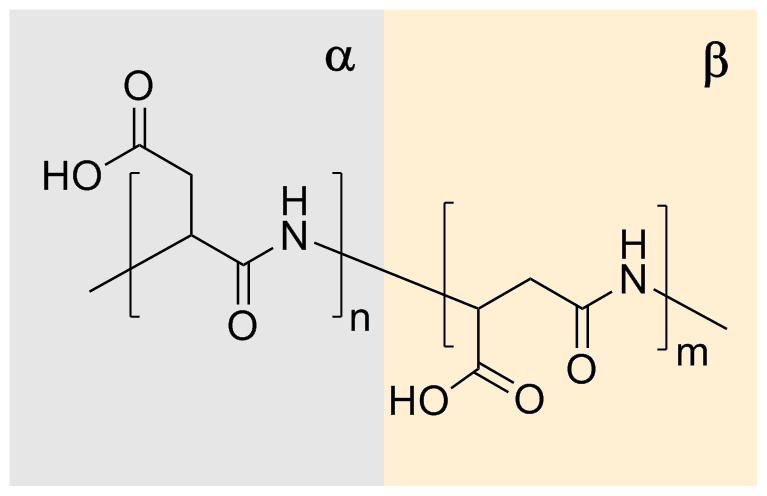

Names
- Other names PASP

Identifiers
CAS Number	25608-40-6 (poly-L-aspartic acid)
ChemSpider	none
CompTox Dashboard (EPA)	DTXSID7022621 DTXSID101010956, DTXSID7022621

Properties
Chemical formula	(C_{4}H_{5}NO_{3})_{n}
Molar mass	variable
- Except where otherwise noted, data are given for materials in their standard state (at 25 °C [77 °F], 100 kPa). Infobox references

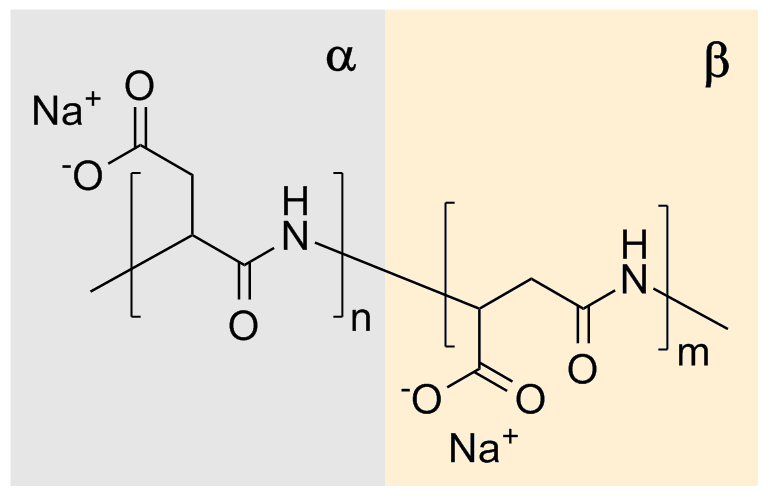
Sodium polyaspartate

Polyaspartic acid (PASA) is a biodegradable, water-soluble condensation polymer based on the amino acid aspartic acid. It is a biodegradable replacement for water softeners and related applications. PASA can be chemically crosslinked with a wide variety of methods to yield PASA hydrogels. The resulting hydrogels are pH-sensitive such that under acidic conditions, they shrink, while the swelling capacity increases under alkaline conditions.

Sodium polyaspartate is a sodium salt of polyaspartic acid.

In nature, PASA has been found in as fragments of larger proteins with length up to 50 amino acids, but as of 2004 had not been isolated as a pure homo polymeric material from any natural source. The first isolation of synthetic oligomeric sodium polyaspartate, obtained by thermal polycondensation of aspartic acid, was reported by Hugo Schiff in late 19th century. Later it was proposed that thermal polymerization process leads through polysuccinimide intermediate. Polyaspartic acid is produced industrially in both the acid form and as the sodium salt.

== Properties and structure ==
Due to presence of carboxylic groups it is polyelectrolyte with anionic character. Naturally occurring PASA fragments consists of α,-linked L-aspartatic acid. In contrast, the repeating unit of synthetic polyaspartic acid may exist in four isomeric forms, depending on the stereochemistry of starting material (D- and L-aspartic acid) and synthetic procedure leading to α and β links. Due to the protein-like backbone (presence of amide bond in the backbone), PASA has suitable biodegradability.

== Synthesis ==
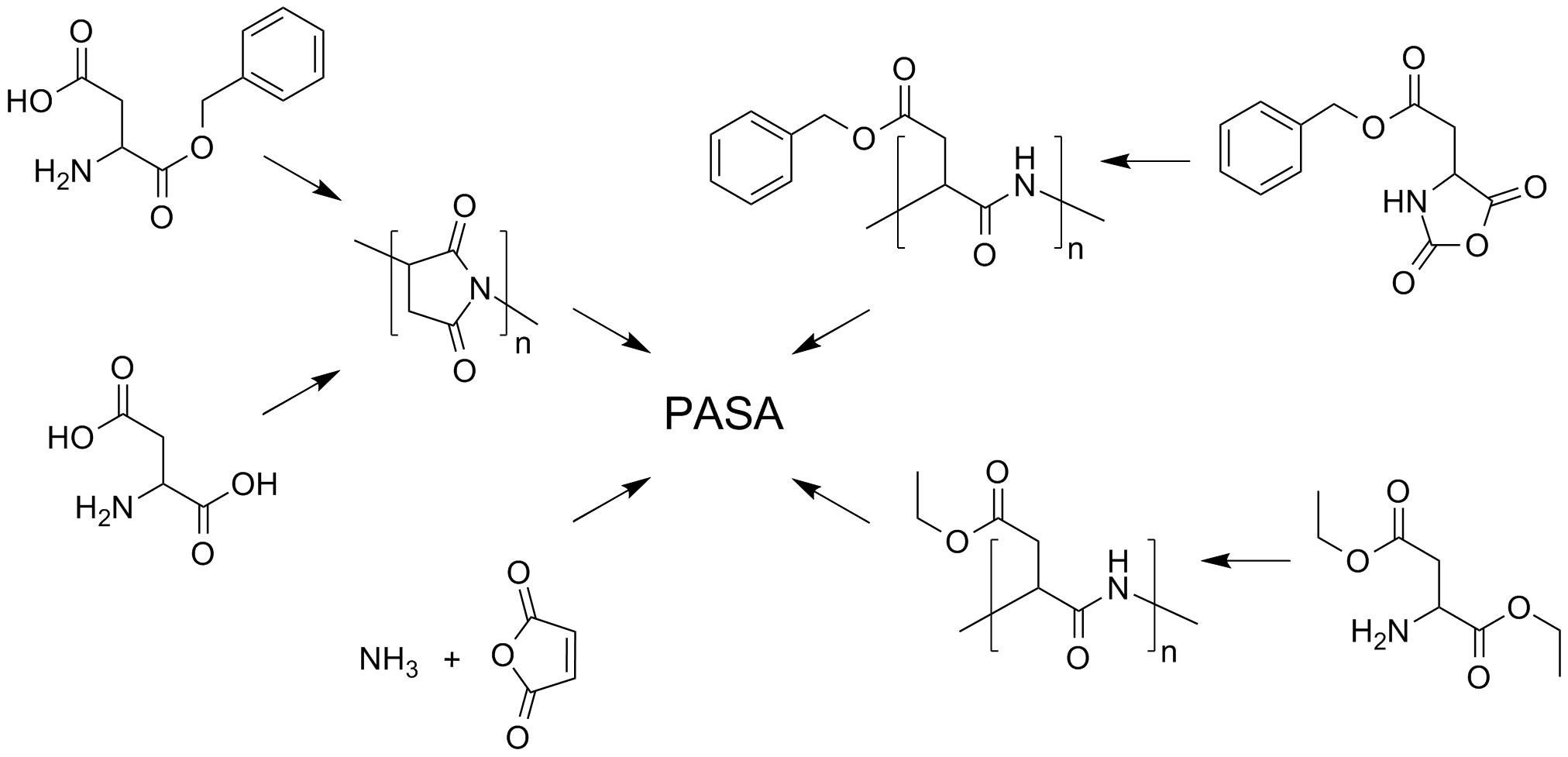
Some synthetic strategies leading to polyaspartic acid

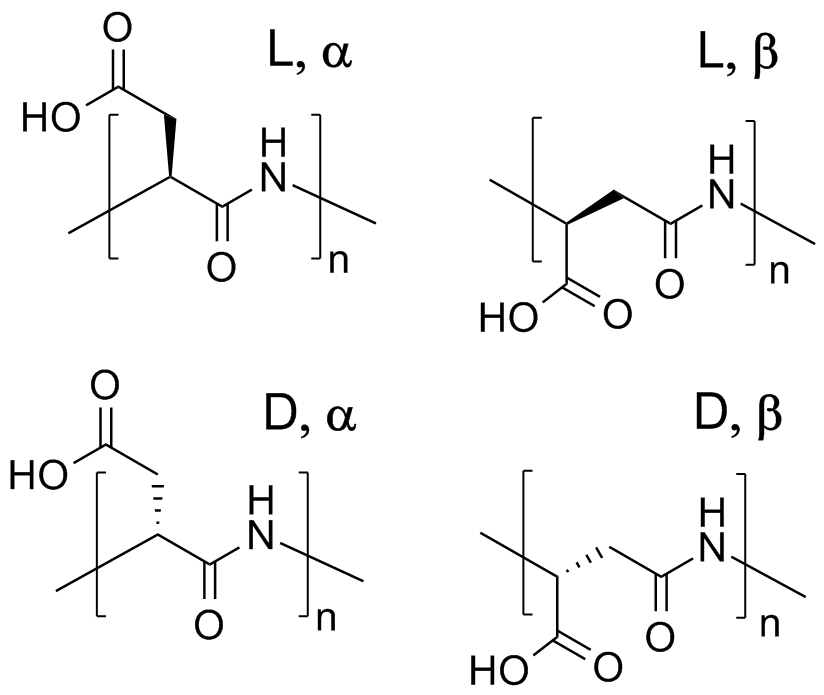
Isomers of PASA repeating unit

Many different routes lead to PASA. In the simplest and the oldest approach aspartic acid is heated to induce dehydration. In a subsequent step the resulting polysuccinimide is treated with aqueous sodium hydroxide, which yields partial opening of the succinimide rings. In this process sodium-DL-(α,β)-poly(aspartate) with 30% α-linkages and 70% β-linkages randomly distributed along the polymer chain, and racemized chiral center of aspartic acid is produced. There were many catalysts reported for improving thermal polymerization method. Main benefits from their application is increasing of the conversion rate and higher molecular weight of the product. Polyaspartic acid can also be synthesized by polymerization of maleic anhydride in presence of ammonium hydroxide. High control over repeating unit isomers can be achieved by polymerization of N-carboxyanhydride (NCA) derivatives, by polymerization of aspartic acid esters or by application of enzyme catalyzed reaction. Pure homopolymers, D- or L-PASA with α- or β-links only, can be synthesized using those methods.

The polymerization reaction is an example of a step-growth polymerization to a polyamide. In one procedure, aspartic acid polymerizes at 180 °C concomitant with dehydration and the formation of a poly(succinimide). The resulting polymer reacts with aqueous sodium hydroxide, which hydrolyzes one of the two amide bonds of the succinimide ring to form a sodium carboxylate. The remaining amide bond is thus the linkage between successive aspartate residues. Each aspartate residue is identified as α or β according to which carbonyl of it is part of the polymer chain. The α form has one carbon in the backbone in addition to the carbonyl itself (and a two-carbon sidechain) whereas the β form has two carbons in the backbone in addition to the carbonyl itself (and a one-carbon sidechain). This reaction gives a sodium poly(aspartate) composed of approximately 30% α-linkages and 70% β-linkages.

Synthesis of sodium poly(aspartate)

== Applications ==
Polyaspartic acid and its derivatives are biodegradable alternatives to traditional polyanionic materials, in particular polyacrylic acid. PASA has ability to inhibit deposition of calcium carbonate, calcium sulfate, barium sulfate, and calcium phosphate and can be used as an antiscaling agent in cooling water systems, water desalination processes, and waste water treatment operations. In addition and due to its ability to chelate metal ions, it provides corrosion inhibition. It can also be used as biodegradable detergent and dispersant for various applications.

PASA also has a variety of biomedical applications. Its high affinity with calcium has been exploited for targeting various forms of drug-containing carriers to the bone. The main component of bone is hydroxyapatite (ca. 70%) (mineralized calcium phosphate). Apart from bone targeting, PASA has been modified for other biomedical applications such as drug delivery, surface coating, DNA delivery, mucoadhesion, and beyond.

As it can be synthesized in an environmentally friendly way and is biodegradable, polyaspartate is a potential green alternative to several materials such as sodium polyacrylate used in disposable diapers and agriculture. It can act as a super-swelling material in diapers, feminine hygiene products, and food packaging. The level of water uptake which is inversely related to the mechanical properties of the hydrogel can be tuned by changing the crosslinking density.In addition to its industrial uses, solid-state NMR studies have shown that poly‑aspartate can integrate into amorphous calcium carbonate (ACC) nanoparticles, adopting α‑helix conformations that significantly stabilize the ACC phase and delay its crystallization. Moreover, NMR relaxation data reveal that structural water molecules within ACC undergo millisecond-timescale 180° flips, suggesting that dynamic hydration plays a crucial role in the stabilization mechanism.

== See also ==
- Polyaspartic esters
