= Cyanophycin =

Two subunits of cyanophycin with alternating directionality.

Cyanophycin, also known as CGP (cyanophycin granule polypeptide) or multi-L-arginyl-poly (L-aspartic acid), is a non-protein, non-ribosomally produced amino acid polymer composed of an aspartic acid backbone and arginine side groups.

Cyanophycin was first detected in 1887 by the Italian botanist Antonino Borzì and can be found in most cyanobacteria and a few heterotrophic bacteria such as Acinetobacter sp. Cyanophycin is largely insoluble under physiological conditions and is accumulated in the form of granules in the cytoplasm during phosphate or sulfur starvation, generally in the early and mid-stationary phase. It is used as a nitrogen- and possibly carbon-storage compound and also serves as a dynamic buffer for fixed nitrogen in cyanobacterial heterocysts. Nitrogen and carbon are mobilized from cyanophycin by intracellular cyanophycinase in the form of aspartate-arginine dipeptides.

Cyanophycin is synthesized from arginine and aspartate in an ATP-dependent reaction catalyzed by a single enzyme, cyanophycin synthetase. Cyanophycin is of potential interest to biotechnology as a source of polyaspartic acid. Due to its unusual polyamphoteric character, cyanophycin is soluble in water under acidic (0.1 M HCl) and alkaline conditions. Heterologous expression of cyanophycin synthetase allows production of cyanophycin in a number of biotechnologically relevant bacteria such as Escherichia coli and Corynebacterium glutamicum.

Since insoluble forms of CGP are easily purified, most studies have overlooked the synthesis of CGP that is soluble at a neutral pH. To compare the two, insoluble CGP can be solubilized by only weak acids while soluble CGP can be separated with the process of precipitation by using acetone or ethanol. In 2014, an experiment by Steinbüchel and Wiefel determined that the amount of lysine residue can regulate the solubility of cyanophycin, with higher levels of lysine negatively correlating to the temperature needed to make the polymer soluble with aqueous solvents. It was concluded that insoluble and soluble CGP are not distinct polymers, since they originate from the same polymer mixture, but are instead classified as mixes of cyanophycin mixtures with varying concentrations of lysine residues.

The ability of lysine to partially replace the arginine side chain encouraged research of CGP variants with amino acids such as ornithine and citrulline. Lysine, ornithine and citrulline all have an affinity for cyanophycin synthase (L-aspartate-adding) enzyme CphA. Wiefel, Bröker and Steinbüchel conducted an experiment demonstrating that citrulline-rich cyanophycin can be produced through the introduction of a citrulline-producing strain. It was also determined that insoluble CGP only exhibited minuscule concentrations of citrulline while soluble CGP was able to produce a high concentration of citrulline. This trend is also similar for ornithine.
