= Polysuccinimide =

Names
- IUPAC name Poly(2,5-dioxopyrrolidine-1,3-diyl)

Identifiers
CAS Number	31586-29-5
3D model (JSmol)	Interactive image
- SMILES: *C1CC(=O)N(C1=O)*

Properties
Chemical formula	(C_{4}H_{3}NO_{2})_{n}
Molar mass	97.07 g·mole^{−1}
Appearance	solid
Solubility in water	* insoluble in water: soluble in Dimethylformamid, Dimethylacetamid, Dimethylsulfoxid, N-Methylpyrrolidone, und Mesitylen+Sulfolan; 30 to 35 at 20 °C in g·100 ml^{−1} in Triethylenglycol
- Except where otherwise noted, data are given for materials in their standard state (at 25 °C [77 °F], 100 kPa). Infobox references

Polysuccinimide (PSI), also known as polyanhydroaspartic acid or polyaspartimide, is formed during the thermal polycondensation of aspartic acid and is the simplest polyimide. Polysuccinimide is insoluble in water, but soluble in some aprotic dipolar solvents. Its reactive nature makes polysuccinimide a versatile starting material for functional polymers made from renewable resources.

The name is derived from the salt of succinic acid, the structurally related succinate.

== Production ==
The production of polysuccinimide was reported by Hugo Schiff as early as 1897. When dry aspartic acid was heated for about 20 hours at 190 °C to 200 °C, a colorless product was obtained. Above 200 °C, a weak yellowing occurs, the yield was almost quantitative.

polysuccinimide-Polykondensation

In the experiments by Hugo Schiff, oligomers and low-molecular polymers were formed in a solid state reaction by polycondensation upon water elimination. This is generally the case in the absence of strong acids, which suppress the thermal decomposition of free amino end groups and thus chain interruption reactions. The formation of the polyimide polysuccinimide can be followed by the intensive absorption band in the infrared spectrum at 1714 cm^{−1}. Many process variants described in the patent literature yield besides a relatively low degree of polymerization often branched and yellow to brown discolored products.

Recent work has focused on increasing the molar mass and achieving a linear chain structure while avoiding decomposition reactions. With a simple "oven process" in which a mixture or paste of crystalline aspartic acid and concentrated phosphoric acid or polyphosphoric acid in a thin layer is heated to 200 °C for 2 to 4 hours, polysuccinimide is produced with molar masses in the range of 30,000 g/mol and cream white shade. The implementation of the polycondensation in several steps (precondensation, comminution, postcondensation), with other dehydrating substances (for example zeolites, triphenyl phosphite) or in the presence of solvents (for example propylene carbonate) provides higher molecular weight products with molar masses in the range of 10,000 to 200,000 g/mol. However, the patent literature does not address the polymer morphology, in particular the degree of branching.

A recent patent describes the simple preparation of high molecular weight, virtually colorless and linear, unbranched polysuccinimide. For this purpose, aspartic acid, which is present as crystalline zwitterion and practically water-insoluble, is firstly dissolved with an aqueous, volatile acid (preferably hydrochloric acid) and mixed with phosphoric acid as condensing agent. The resulting homogeneous solution is evaporated at 120 °C and the resulting glassy mass is then polycondensed at 180 °C to 200 °C for at least one hour. The phosphoric acid is washed out and the dried polysuccinimide is converted by mild alkaline hydrolysis into water-soluble polyaspartic acid; the molar mass of which can be determined by gel permeation chromatography. The process provides reproducible polysuccinimide with molar masses above 100,000 g/mol.

Synthetic routes for polysuccinimides based on maleic acid monoammonium salt, maleic anhydride and ammonia or based on the intermediately formed maleic acid monoamide achieved only low molar masses of a few 1,000 g/mol and yielded colored products. The same was the case for "green" process variants in supercritical carbon dioxide and while avoiding mineral acids as catalysts.

PSI via Maleinsäureanhydrid

Due to the lower cost of maleic anhydride and ammonia, starting materials produced from fossil raw materials, no L-aspartic acid (of biogenic origin) is used in the production of the commercial product Baypure® polysuccinimide either.

== Properties ==
Polysuccinimide is produced as an odourless, non-hygroscopic, cream-white to brown powder which is soluble in aprotic dipolar solvents such as dimethylformamide, dimethylacetamide, dimethylsulfoxide, N-methylpyrrolidone, triethylene glycol or mesitylene/sulfolane mixtures. Polysuccinimide hydrolyses in water only very slowly. In diluted alkaline media (e.g. 1M sodium hydroxide solution), hydrolysis takes place in α- and β-position of the succinimide (2,5-pyrrolidinedione) ring structures and racemization follows at the chiral center of the aspartic acid, yielding the water-soluble sodium salt of the poly(α, β)-DL-aspartic acid. The α form is formed to approx. 30%, the β form to approx. 70% in random arrangement along the polymer chain.

PSI zu Polyasparaginsäure

In more basic solutions or with longer reaction times, the amide linkages in the polymer chain are attacked upon degradation of the molar mass. The presence of amide bonds makes the polyaspartic acid obtained in the hydrolysis relatively biodegradable (about 70% in wastewater), even of initially highly crosslinked polysuccinimides.

== Use ==
The polysuccinimide developed by Bayer AG and marketed by Lanxess AG under the brand name Baypure® DSP with an average molecular weight of 4,400 g/mol is partially hydrolyzed even at slightly elevated pH values and is thus swellable in highly crosslinked form or water-soluble in linear form. The copoly-(succinimide-aspartic acid) formed by partial hydrolysis and especially polyaspartic acid (trade name Baypure® DS 100) produced by partial hydrolysis is suitable as a long-lasting inhibitor against limescale deposition in water treatment and applications in the oil and mining industries, and as a setting retarder for cement in the construction industry. Patent literature mentions polysuccinimide applications as chelating agents, inhibitors against scale formation, dispersant, humectants, and fertilizer additives.

The opening of the pyrrolidinedione ring structures in polysuccinimide via aminolysis with ammonia water (containgin NH_{4}OH) produces poly-(α, β)-DL-asparagine, with hydrazine poly-(α, β)-DL-aspartylhydrazide (PAHy) and with functional amines, e.g. ethanolamine poly-(α), β)-DL-2-hydroxyethylaspartate (PHEA). PHEA can be used a plasma expander with good biocompatibility and biodegradability, high water solubility at low manufacturing costs and was investigated more intensive as a potential drug carrier) in medical applications.

polysuccinimide Derivatisierung

Cross-linked poly(α, β)-DL aspartic acid sodium salt, which is the commercially most interesting polysuccinimide derivative, has been extensively tested for its suitability as a biodegradable superabsorbent compared to the non-biodegradable standard cross-linked sodium polyacrylate. The results obtained have not yet led to the use of crosslinked polyaspartic acid in large-volume applications for superabsorbents (e.g. baby diapers).
