= Cyanophycinase =

Class of enzymes

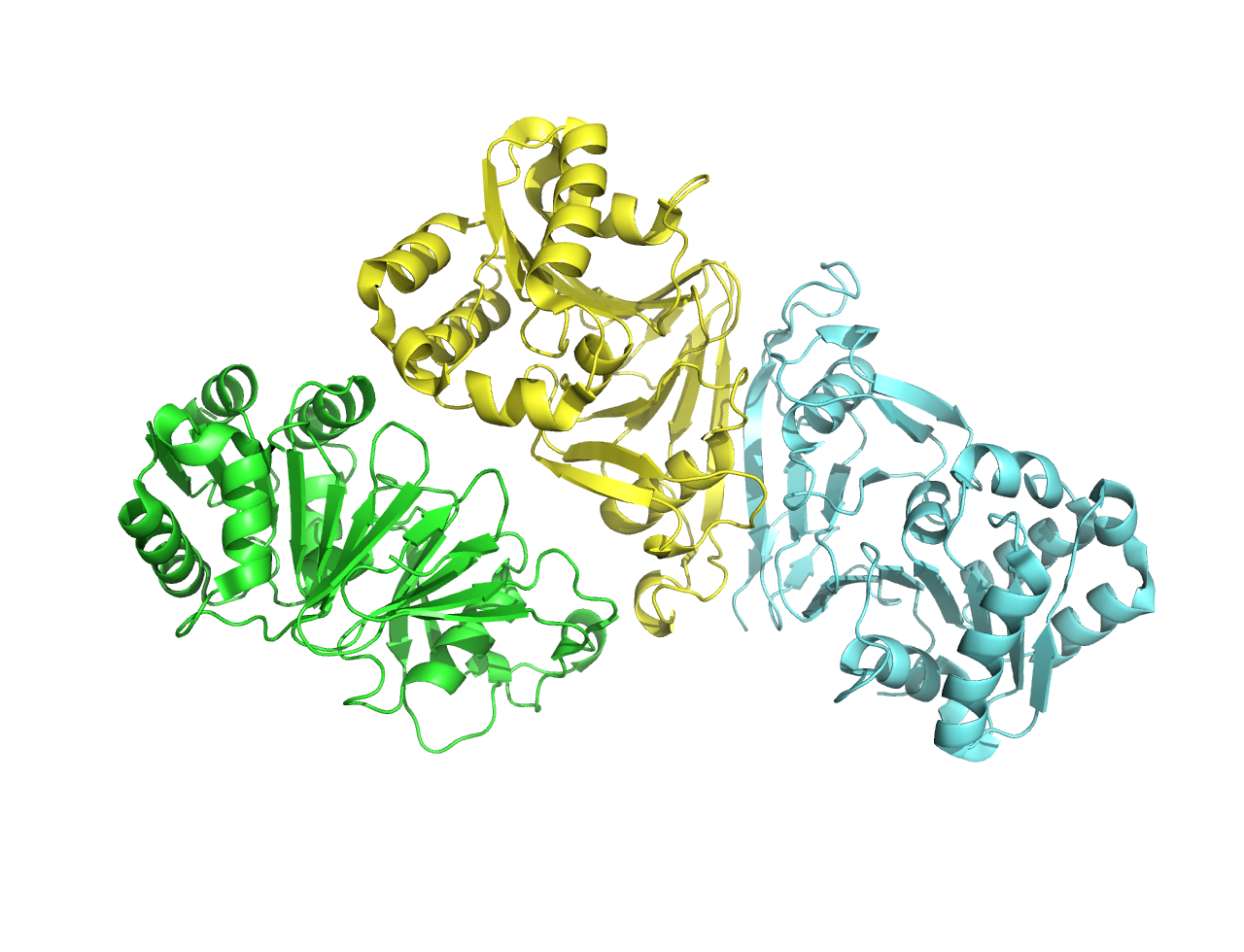
- Asymmetric Unit of Cyanophycinase. PDB: 3EN0; Cyanophycinase consists of three identical chains.

Identifiers
- EC no.: 3.4.15.6
- CAS no.: 131554-16-0

Databases
- IntEnz: IntEnz view
- BRENDA: BRENDA entry
- ExPASy: NiceZyme view
- KEGG: KEGG entry
- MetaCyc: metabolic pathway
- PRIAM: profile
- PDB structures: RCSB PDB PDBe PDBsum
Search
- PMC: articles
- PubMed: articles
- NCBI: proteins

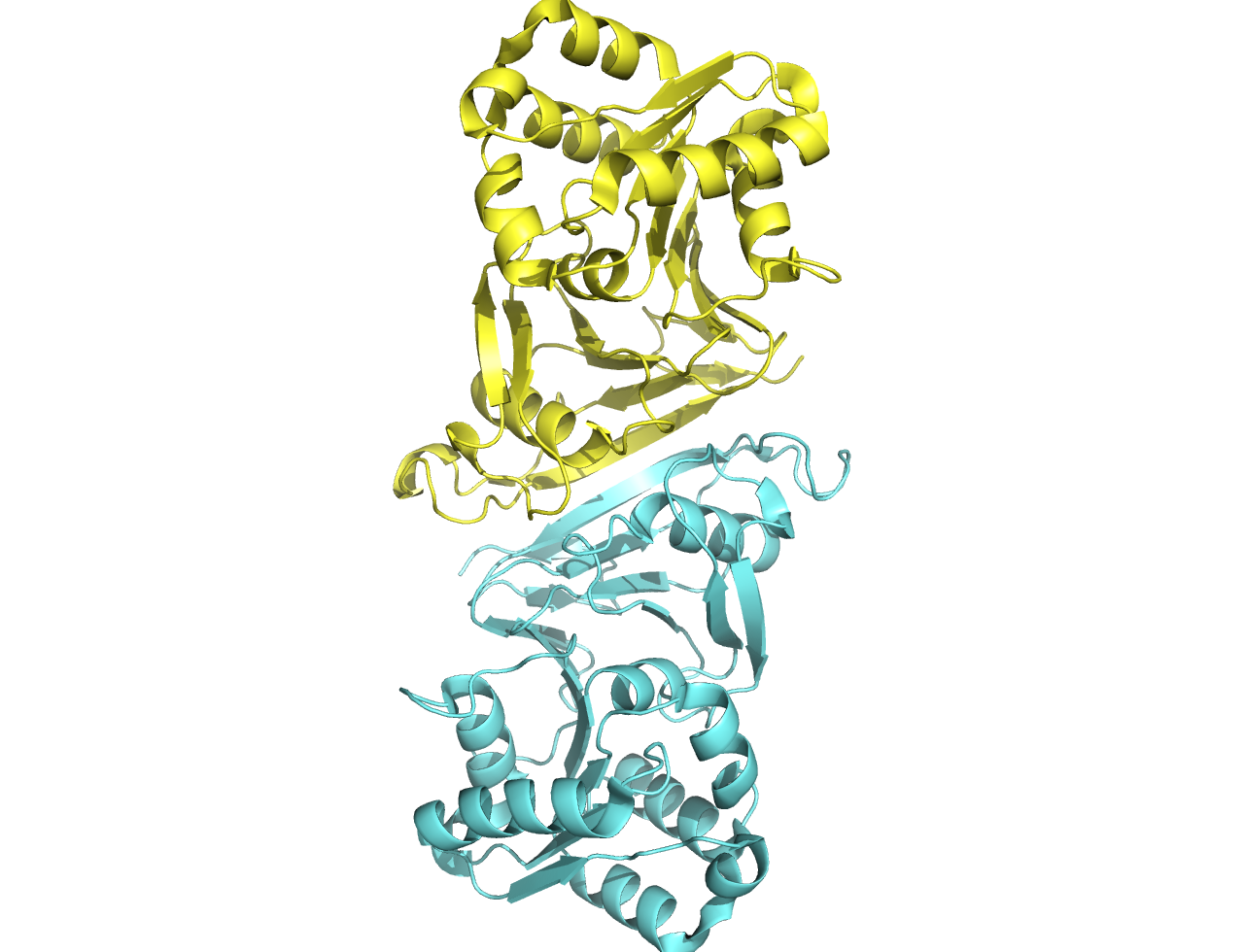
Biological assembly of cyanophycinase determined from the organism Synechocystis sp. PCC6803

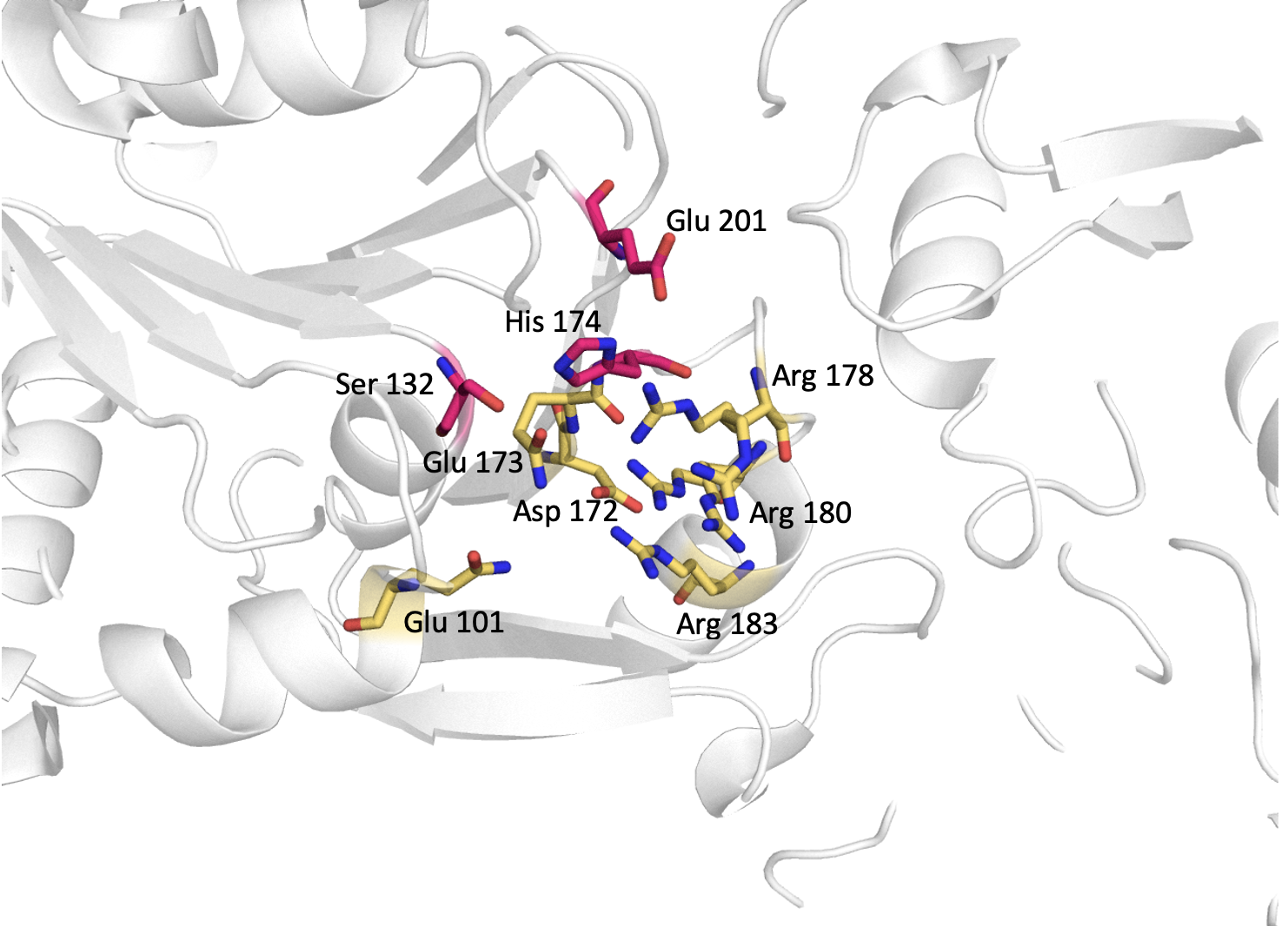
The catalytic triad of Cyanophycinase is Ser 132, His 174, and Glu 201. Other conserved residues which form a pocket around the serine include: Gln101, Asp172, Gln173, Arg178, Arg180 and Arg183

Cyanophycinase (EC 3.4.15.6, cyanophycin degrading enzyme, beta-Asp-Arg hydrolysing enzyme, CGPase, CphB, CphE, cyanophycin granule polypeptidase, extracellular CGPase) is an enzyme. It catalyses the following chemical reaction

[L-Asp(4-L-Arg)]_{n} + H_{2}O $\rightleftharpoons$ [L-Asp(4-L-Arg)]_{n-1} + L-Asp(4-L-Arg)

The enzyme is highly specific for the branched polypeptide cyanophycin. It is similar to Dipeptidase E, another S51 family serine protease.

== Structure ==
The asymmetric unit of cyanophycinase consists of three identical chains, each containing 291 residues. The structure of cyanophycinase was determined from the freshwater cyanobacterium Synechocystis sp. PCC 6803 at 1.5-A resolution, which showed that the structure is dimeric.

== Enzyme function ==
Cyanophycinase is a carboxy terminal specific exopeptidase, meaning it catalyzes the cleavage of the carboxy terminal peptide bond of cyanophycin. It was hypothesized that cyanophycinase was a serine protease due to extreme inhibition of the enzyme when used with known serine protease inhibitors, such as DMSO. Site directed mutagenesis experiments confirmed that the enzyme is a serine protease and suggested that Ser 132 is the primary catalytic residue. Other key residues for specificity include Gln101, Asp172, Gln173, Arg178, Arg180 and Arg183 which form a conserved pocket adjacent to Ser 132. Kinetic characterization of the enzyme demonstrates that the enzyme displays Michaelis–Menten kinetics with a k_{cat} of 16.5 s^{−1} and a k_{cat}/K_{M} of 7.5 × 10^{6} M^{−1} s^{−1}.

== Connection to nitrogen storage in Cyanobacteria ==
Cyanophycin is highly resistant to degradation by all conventional proteases, and the only enzyme known to be capable of hydrolyzing it is cyanophycinase. Cyanophycin is a non-ribosomally synthesized peptidyl polymer that is used for nitrogen storage by cyanobacteria and other select eubacteria. Approximately 90% of cyanobacteria are diazotrophic, meaning that they can grow without an external source of fixed nitrogen. Diazotrophic growth was severely impaired in bacteria with a mutated cyanophycinase gene, indicating that the inability to degrade cyanophycin is detrimental for the diazotrophic growth of the cyanobacterium, due to an excess of nitrogen storage.
