= Muramyl ligase =

Protein family

Mur_ligase

Identifiers
- Symbol: Mur_ligase
- Pfam: PF01225
- Pfam clan: CL0063
- InterPro: IPR000713
- PROSITE: PDOC00773
- SCOP2: 1uag / SCOPe / SUPFAM
- OPM superfamily: 350
- OPM protein: 1p31
Available protein structures:
- PDB: IPR000713 PF01225 (ECOD; PDBsum)
- AlphaFold: IPR000713; PF01225

The bacterial cell wall provides strength and rigidity to counteract internal osmotic pressure, and protection against the environment. The peptidoglycan layer gives the cell wall its strength, and helps maintain the overall shape of the cell. The basic peptidoglycan structure of both Gram-positive and Gram-negative bacteria comprises a sheet of glycan chains connected by short cross-linking polypeptides. Biosynthesis of peptidoglycan is a multi-step (11-12 steps) process comprising three main stages:

1. formation of UDP-N-acetylmuramic acid (UDPMurNAc) from N-acetylglucosamine (GlcNAc).
2. addition of a short polypeptide chain to the UDPMurNAc.
3. addition of a second GlcNAc to the disaccharide-pentapeptide building block and transport of this unit through the cytoplasmic membrane and incorporation into the growing peptidoglycan layer.

Stage two involves four key Mur ligase enzymes: MurC, MurD, MurE (EC) and MurF (EC). These four Mur ligases are responsible for the successive additions of L-alanine, D-glutamate, meso-diaminopimelate or L-lysine, and D-alanyl-D-alanine to UDP-N-acetylmuramic acid. All four Mur ligases are topologically similar to one another, even though they display low sequence identity. They are each composed of three domains: an N-terminal Rossmann-fold domain responsible for binding the UDPMurNAc substrate; a central domain (similar to ATP-binding domains of several ATPases and GTPases); and a C-terminal domain (similar to dihydrofolate reductase fold) that appears to be associated with binding the incoming amino acid. The conserved sequence motifs found in the four Mur enzymes also map to other members of the Mur ligase family, including folylpolyglutamate synthetase, cyanophycin synthetase and the capB enzyme from Bacillales.

This family includes UDP-N-acetylmuramate-L-alanine ligase (MurC), UDP-N-acetylmuramoylalanyl-D-glutamate-2,6-diaminopimelate ligase (MurE), and UDP-N-acetylmuramoyl-tripeptide-D-alanyl-D-alanine ligase (MurF). This entry also includes folylpolyglutamate synthase that transfers glutamate to folylpolyglutamate and cyanophycin synthetase that catalyses the biosynthesis of the cyanobacterial reserve material multi-L-arginyl-poly-L-aspartate (cyanophycin).
