= Cosolvent =

Substance added to improve solubility

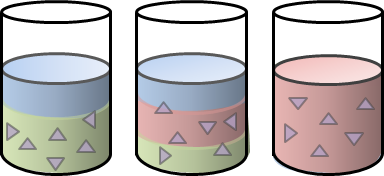
Cosolvents improve solubility between non-miscible phases, as demonstrated by a solute dissolved in organic solvent but insoluble in water (left). A cosolvent miscible in both phases and able to dissolve the solute is added to form a homogeneous solution of water, organic solvent, and compound (right).

In chemistry, cosolvents are substances added to a primary solvent in small amounts to increase the solubility of a poorly-soluble compound. Their use is most prevalent in chemical and biological research relating to pharmaceuticals and food science, where alcohols are frequently used as cosolvents in water (often less than 5% by volume) to dissolve hydrophobic molecules during extraction, screening, and formulation. Cosolvents find applications also in environmental chemistry and are known as effective countermeasures against pollutant non-aqueous phase liquids, as well as in the production of functional energy materials and synthesis of biodiesel.

The topic of cosolvency has attracted attention from many theorists and practicing researchers who seek to predict the solubility of compounds using cosolvent systems, and it is the subject of considerable research in scientific literature. Studies exist to propose and review methods of modeling cosolvency using calculation, to describe empirical correlations of cosolvents and observed solvation phenomena, and to report the utility of cosolvent systems in various fields.

== In pharmaceuticals ==
Long-standing challenges in pharmaceutical chemistry include overcoming the inherent hydrophobicity/lipophilicity of certain molecules for treatment and finding effective synthesis procedures for complex molecules. Cosolvents are able to aid researchers in both the trials of formulation and synthesis.

=== Formulation ===
In pharmaceutical chemistry, numerous methods exist to help solubilize poorly water-soluble drugs for use in treatment. These methods include cosolvency, hydrotropism, complexation, ionization, and using surface active agents. The most pervasive is the application of non-toxic cosolvents with water to produce formulations that can dissolve hydrophobic molecules while maintaining cohesion with biological systems. Common cosolvents for this purpose are ethanol, propylene glycol, glycerine, glycofural, and polyethylene glycols. The effect of cosolvency on drug solubilization can be great, as evidenced by a 2009 study in which researchers from Panjab University showed the solubility of various anti-diabetic drugs increase by more than 500 times by use of a cosolvent.

=== Synthesis ===
Cosolvents prove useful in synthetic applications as well as in formulation. Cosolvent systems are commonly specific to the synthetic target being studied, so reviewed here are the generalized findings of several publications that exemplify important points on the subject:

In a 2017 project, researchers at Cornell University studied the effect of cosolvency in oxazolidinone enolizations mediated by lithium hexamethyldisilazide (LiHMDS). This reaction pathway was exemplified by the group in the synthesis of filibuvir, a drug used for the treatment of hepatitis C that is produced on plant-scale by Pfizer. The researchers focus primarily on polymer formation in systems of tetrahydrofuran with hydrocarbon cosolvents, and find that the rate is strongly sensitive to the cosolvent utilized. Among other results, the study concludes that cosolvent choice is of acute importance in the pharmaceutical industry where percent yield, trace impurities, and processing techniques are chemically, financially, and toxicologically relevant. However, the researchers take care to mention that the mechanisms that bring about these empirical differences in cosolvent systems are not yet well-understood.

A 2016 paper from researchers at Hokkaido University describes a cosolvent-promoted mechanism for benzylating hydroxyl groups in the synthesis of sucrose derivatives. The group reports a method by which the benzylation reaction, empirically low yielding and with significant formation of byproducts due to the generally low reactivity of the target 1’-hydroxyl group in sucrose, was carried out to up to 95% yields with excellent selectivity for the synthetic molecule. They accomplished this yield by utilizing a cosolvent system of hexanes and methylene chloride, and extrapolated the method to include a number of benzyl halide substrates, as well as alcohols, glucose, and ribose derivatives. This study is one of many where reaction yields in organic synthesis can be optimized by application of polar/non-polar cosolvent systems.

Cosolvents also play a role in the biochemical subdiscipline: a 2012 study from researchers at the South China University of Technology reports how cosolvent parameters can be optimized to obtain higher yields in enzyme-catalyzed reactions. Specifically, the group looked at the prune seed meal-catalyzed synthesis of bioactive anti-depressant salidroside, and found that using ethylene glycol diacetate in conjunction with an ionic liquid cosolvent afforded up to a 50% increase in product yield. The use of ionic liquids as cosolvents in this study and many similar demonstrates the variability of this methodology, where cosolvent systems can extend beyond standard conventions of polar and non-polar solvents to affect change on a mechanistic level.

== In environmental chemistry ==
Cosolvents have long been reported to be effective tools in environmental chemistry, both as powerful means of pollution remediation and as important additives in syntheses of green technologies, such as solar cells, biofuels, and sorbents. In some cases, the utilization of cosolvents also allows for satisfaction of a broad goal in the field of green chemistry: reduction in unsustainable solvent use by enhancing substrate solubility or providing greener alternatives.

=== Remediation ===
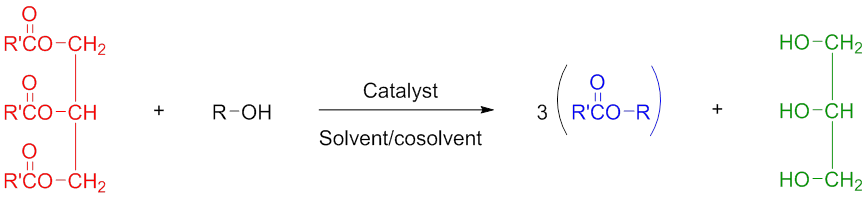
The transesterification reaction by which vegetable oils (red) are reacted with alcohol to yield the associated ester (blue) and glyercol (green). The product esters can be used as biofuel for a variety of purposes.

In the context of aqueous pollutant remediation, cosolvents can be used in a variety of functions, including to enhance the performance of surfactants, to increase solubility of a non-aqueous phase liquid (NAPL), and to physically mobilize NAPLs by decreasing interfacial tension between aqueous and organic phases. Due to toxicological concerns, the main agents used for remediation are aqueous solutions of 1-5% alcohols by volume, which can be flushed through a polluted site and later extracted from the bulk water. This “cosolvent flooding” (called alcohol flooding when using >5% by volume) is often combined with salinity modification, in situ chemical oxidation, and temperature alteration to provide the most effective methods of removing NAPLs from a water source. In situ flushing is a process by which soil is decontaminated in a similar manner as aqueous environments.

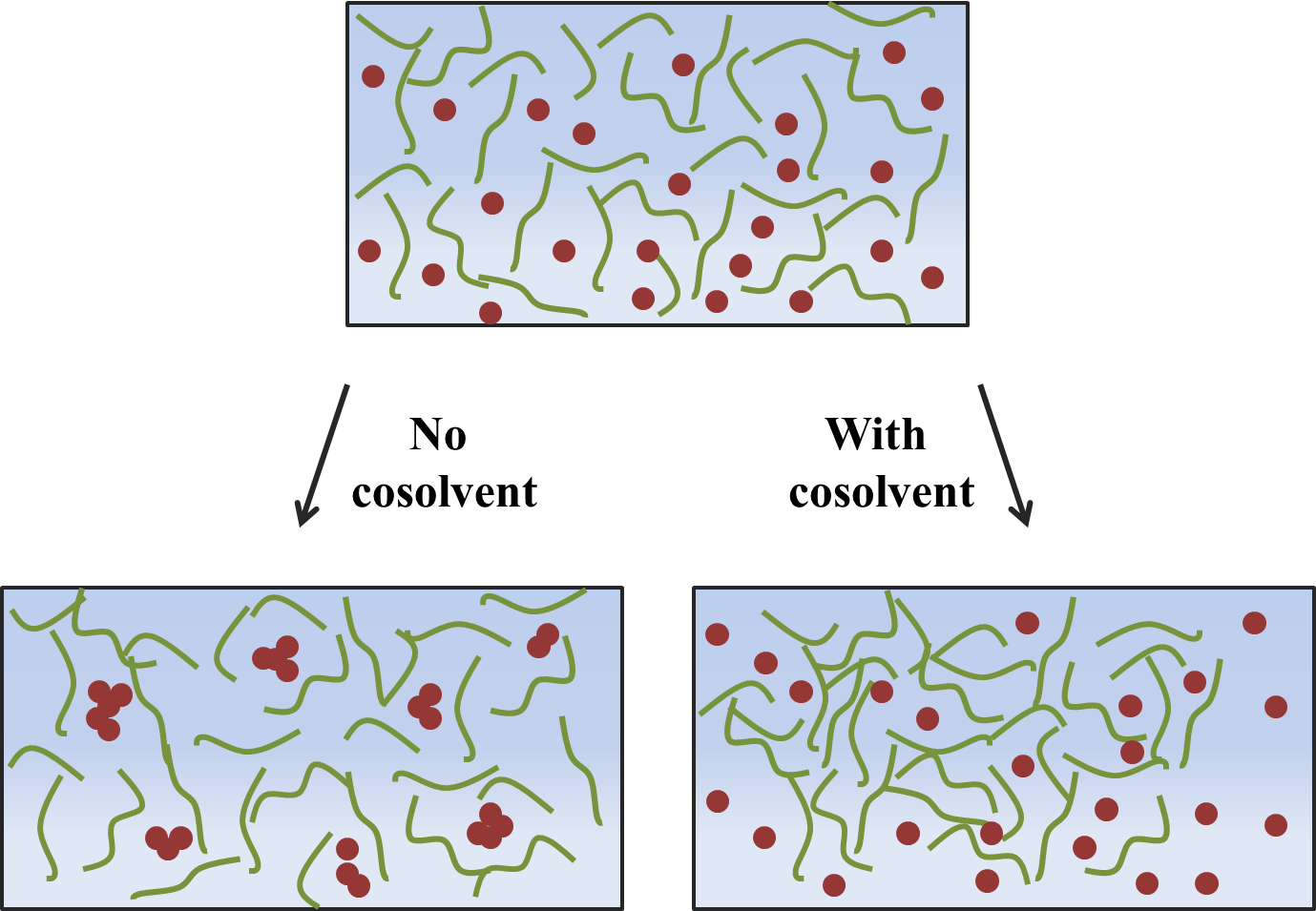
In the production of polymers, such as those used in solar cell technologies, cosolvents can assist in separation between phases. Beginning with a mixture of polymer and solvent (top), cosolvents encourage the aggregation of polymers (right), simplifying production and improving performance. Without the use of cosolvent, droplets of primary solvent coalesce into distinct domains and polymer is more randomly dispersed (left). Adapted from Janssen et al (2015).

Complications that arise from using alcohol cosolvents in aqueous remediation include the formation of macroemulsions, desorption of organic contaminants from aquifer solids, and introduction of toxicity, flammability, and explosivity at higher concentrations.

=== Green technologies ===
The versatile and variable nature of cosolvents has allowed them to be used in many applications regarding green technology. One such application is in the processing of polymer solar cells, where cosolvents have been recognized as being important additives to reduce phase separation of main solvent into droplets, which disrupts continuity in the sample and leads to less favorable morphologies. In most cases, a cosolvent is used in 1-10% by volume and acts by encouraging polymer aggregation in either the casting or solution evaporation stages. While the use of cosolvents in this context is nearly ubiquitous in organic solar cell research, there remains a lack of understanding on the dynamical processes by which cosolvency achieves this effect.

Cosolvents also play an important role in the production of biofuels from assorted biomass. For example, in efforts to convert used sunflower oil into biodiesel via transesterification, the utilization of a cosolvent in methanol was found responsible for improving product conversion from 78% to near completion in a short time frame. In another example, a tetrahydrofuran-water mixture was found to be incredibly effective in extracting lignin from biomass to yield fermentable sugars, despite that both THF and water are poor solvents for this purpose. By simplifying the synthesis and processing procedures for these and other developing green technologies, cosolvents are reducing waste from lost yields, poor solubility of substrates, and excess processing. As time moves forward, even better systems are being developed, and directed research into greener cosolvents is being explored.

== Approximating cosolvent effects ==
A variety of models exist to describe and predict the effects of cosolvents. Relying heavily on the application of mathematical models and chemical theory, these models range from simple to relatively complex. The first model and also the simplest is still in use today: the model of Yalkowsky. Yalkowsky’s model utilizes the algebraic mixing rule or log-linear model:

logX_{m} = ƒ_{1}logX_{1} + ƒ_{2}logX_{2}

Where X_{m} is the mole fraction solubility of the solute, X_{1} and X_{2} denote the mole fraction solubility in neat cosolvent and water.

While this model is only correlative in nature, further analysis allows for the creation of a predictive element. Simplifying the above equation to:

logX_{m} = logX_{2} + σ • ƒ_{1}

Where σ is the solubilization power of the cosolvent and theoretically is equal to log(X_{1}/X_{2}).

One can incorporate the work of Valvani et al., which shows:

Where M and N are cosolvent constants that are not dependent on the nature of the solute, and have been tabulated for many commonly used cosolvents. These transformations effectively turn the Yalkowsky log-linear model into a predictive model, where a researcher can predict with fair accuracy the cosolvent concentration for solubilization of a compound using only aqueous solubility data. For a more in-depth discussion of cosolvent modeling systems, the reader is directed to reviews by Jouyban (2008), Smith and Mazo (2008), and for biochemical context, Canchi and Garcia (2013).

A simpler view at choosing cosolvents involves looking at measureable properties of varying cosolvent systems and making a determination from empirical evidence. Researchers from the University of Arizona and the University of Wisconsin-Madison review a selection of parameters in an Environmental Toxicology and Chemistry paper, among them the partition coefficient, surface tension, dielectric constant, interfacial tension, and others. Using naphthalene as a representative case of solubilizing hydrophobic organic compounds (HOCs), the authors report that a majority of the most commonly used parameters fall short of accurately describing solubility, including dielectric constant, partition coefficient, and surface tension. Instead, they find that Hildebrand’s solubility parameter, E_{t}(30), and interfacial tension correlate more favorably with empirical trends. The practicing chemist should take these results into account when developing a cosolvent system for a given target.
