= PH-sensitive polymers =

pH sensitive or pH responsive polymers are materials which will respond to the changes in the pH of the surrounding medium by varying their dimensions. Materials may swell, collapse, or change depending on the pH of their environment. This behavior is exhibited due to the presence of certain functional groups in the polymer chain. pH-sensitive materials can be either acidic or basic, responding to either basic or acidic pH values. These polymers can be designed with many different architectures for different applications. Key uses of pH sensitive polymers are controlled drug delivery systems, biomimetics, micromechanical systems, separation processes, and surface functionalization.

== Types ==
pH sensitive polymers can be broken into two categories: those with acidic groups (such as -COOH and -SO_{3}H) and those with basic groups (-NH_{2}). The mechanism of response is the same for both, only the stimulus varies. The general form of the polymer is a backbone with functional "pendant groups" that hang off of it. When these functional groups become ionized in certain pH levels, they acquire a charge (+/-). Repulsions between like charges cause the polymers to change shape.

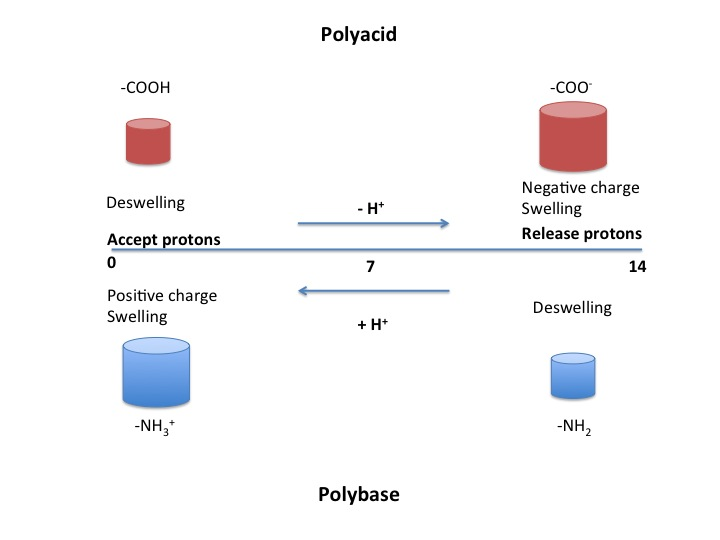
A summary of how polyacids and polybases behavior under different pH conditions.

=== Polyacids ===
Polyacids, also known as anionic polymers, are polymers that have acidic groups. Examples of acidic functional groups include carboxylic acids (-COOH), sulfonic acids (-SO_{3}H), phosphonic acids, and boronic acids. Polyacids accept protons at low pH values. At higher pH values, they deprotonate and become negatively charged. The negative charges create a repulsion that causes the polymer to swell. This swelling behavior is observed when the pH is greater than the pKa of the polymer. Examples include polymethyl methacrylate polymers (pharmacologyonline 1 (2011)152-164) and cellulose acetate phthalate.

=== Polybases ===
Polybases are the basic equivalent of polyacids and are also known as cationic polymers. They accept protons at low pH like polyacids do, but they then become positively charged. In contrast, at higher pH values they are neutral. Swelling behavior is seen when the pH is less than the pKa of the polymer.

=== Natural polymers ===
Although many sources talk about synthetic pH sensitive polymers, natural polymers can also display pH-responsive behavior. Examples include chitosan, hyaluronic acid, alginic acid and dextran. Chitosan, a frequently used example, is cationic. Since DNA is negatively charged, DNA could be attached to chitosan as a way to deliver genes to cells. Alginic acid, on the other hand, is anionic. It is often evaluated as a calcium-salt for drug delivery applications(International journal of biological macromolecules 75 (2015) 409-17) . Natural polymers have appeal because they display good biocompatibility, which makes them useful for biomedical applications. However, a disadvantage to natural polymers is that researchers can have more control over the structure of synthetic polymers and so can design those polymers for specific applications.

Chemical structure of hyaluronic acid

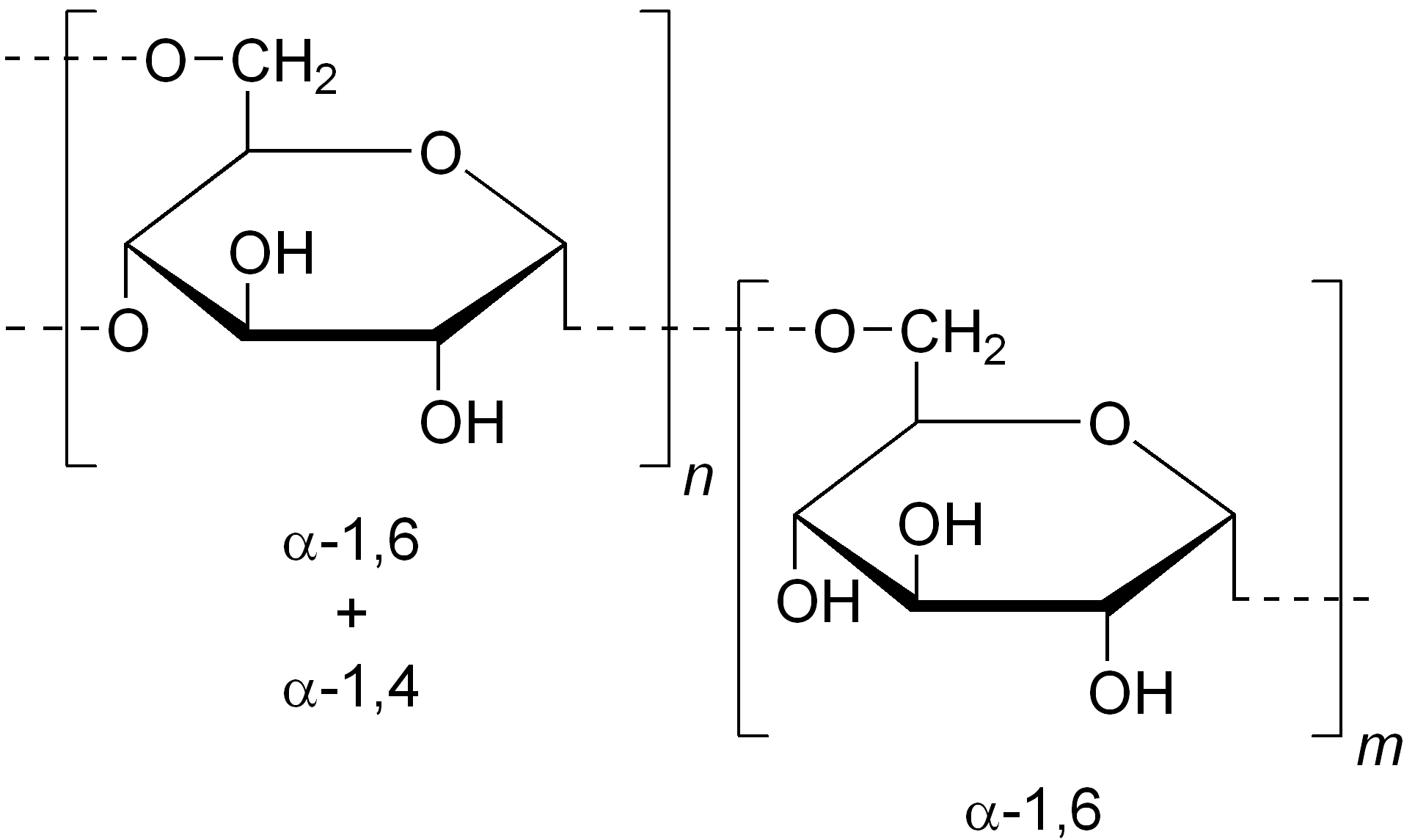
Chemical structure of dextran

Chemical structure of Chitosan

=== Multi-stimuli polymers ===
Polymers can be designed to respond to more than one external stimulus, such as pH and temperature. Often, these polymers are structured as a copolymer where each polymer displays one type of response.

== Structure ==
pH sensitive polymers have been created with linear block copolymer, star, branched, dendrimer, brush, and comb architectures. Polymers of different architectures will self-assemble into different structures. This self-assembly can occur due to the nature of the polymer and the solvent, or due to a change in pH. pH changes can also cause the larger structure to swell or deswell. For example, block copolymers often form micelles, as will star polymers and branched polymers. However, star and branched polymers can form rod or worm-shaped micelles rather than the typical spheres. Brush polymers are usually used for modifying surfaces since their structure doesn’t allow them to form a larger structure like a micelle.

== Response to change in pH ==
Often, the response to different pH values is swelling or deswelling. For example, polyacids release protons to become negatively charged at high pH. Since polymer chains are often in close proximity to other parts of the same chain or to other chains, like-charged parts of the polymer repel each other. This repulsion leads to a swelling of the polymer.

Polymers can also form micelles (spheres) in response to a change in pH. This behavior can occur with linear block copolymers. If the different blocks of the copolymer have different properties, they can form micelles with one type of block on the inside and one type on the outside. For example, in water the hydrophobic blocks of a copolymer could end up on the inside of a micelle, with hydrophilic blocks on the outside. Additionally, a change in pH could cause micelles to swap their inner and outer molecules depending on the properties of the polymers involved.

Diagram of a micelle, showing how in aqueous solution the hydrophilic parts of the molecules would be on the outside and the hydrophobic parts would be on the inside of the sphere.

Responses other than simply swelling and deswelling with a change in pH are possible as well. Researchers have created polymers that undergo a sol-gel transition (from a solution to a gel) with a change in pH, but which also change from being a stiff gel to a soft gel for certain pH values.

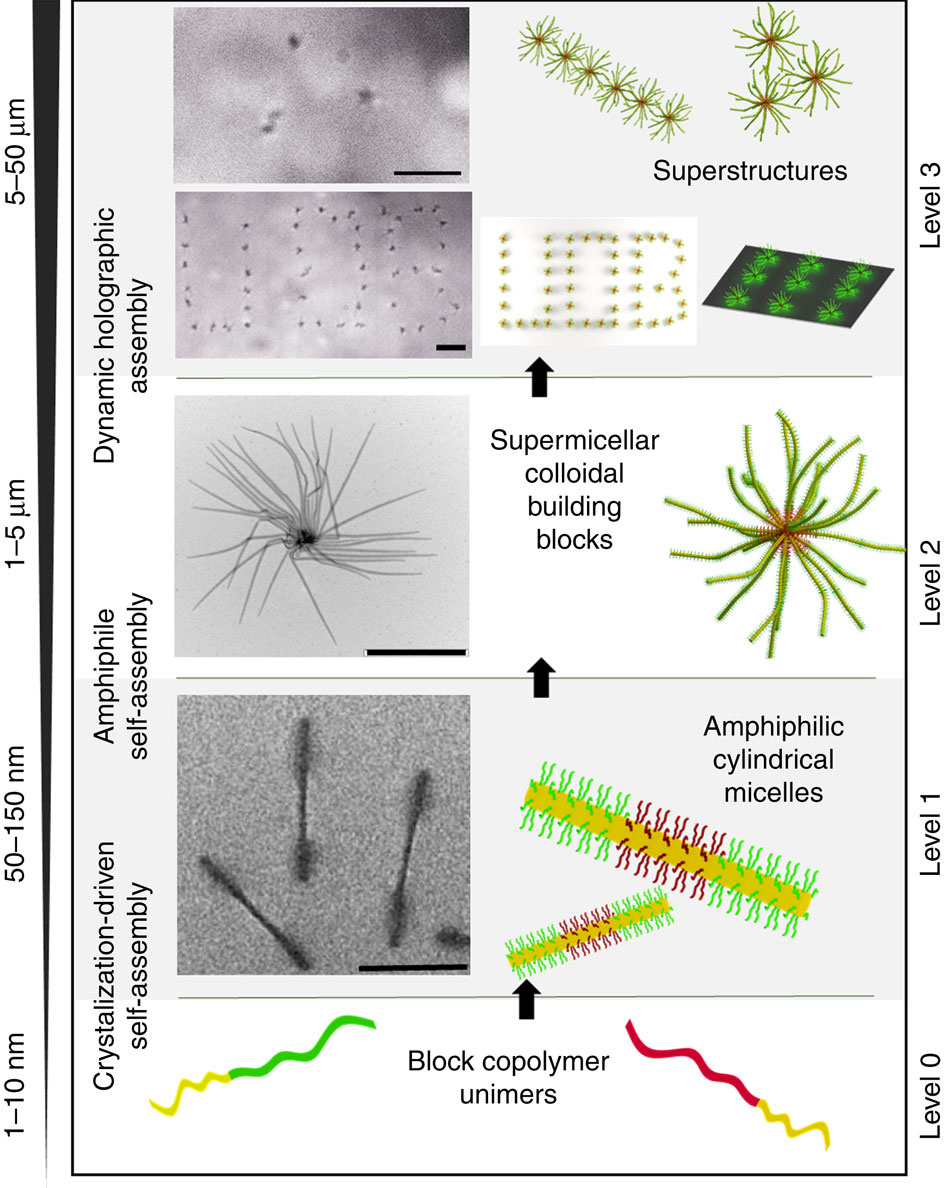
Copolymers can assemble into micelles, which can then assemble into larger structures. This assembly can be pH dependent.

== Synthesis ==
pH sensitive polymers can be synthesized using several common polymerization methods. Functional groups may need to be protected so that they do not react depending on the type of polymerization. The masking can be removed after polymerization so that they regain their pH-sensitive functionality. Living polymerization is often used for making pH sensitive polymers because molecular weight distribution of the final polymers can be controlled. Examples include group transfer polymerization (GTP), atom transfer radical polymerization (ATRP), and reversible addition-fragmentation chain transfer (RAFT). Graft copolymers are a popular type to synthesize because their structure is a backbone with branches. The composition of the branches can be changed to achieve different properties. Hydrogels can be produced using emulsion polymerization.

== Characterization ==
=== Contact angle ===
Several methods can be used to measure the contact angle of a water drop on the surface of a polymer. The contact angle value is used to quantify wettability or hydrophobicity of the polymer.

=== Degree of swelling ===
Equal to (swollen weight-deswelled weight)/deswelled weight *100% and determined by massing polymers before and after swelling. This indicates how much the polymer swelled upon a change in pH.

=== pH critical point ===
The pH at which a significant structural change in how the molecules are arranged is observed. This structural change does not involve breaking bonds, but rather a change in conformation. For example, a swelling/deswelling transition would constitute a reversible conformational change. The value of the pH critical point can be determined by examining swelling percentage as a function of pH. Researchers aim to design molecules that transition at a pH that matters for the given application.

=== Surface changes ===
Confocal microscopy, scanning electron microscopy, Raman spectroscopy, and atomic force microscopy are all used to determine how the surface of a polymer changes in response to pH.

== Applications ==
=== Purification and separation ===
pH sensitive polymers have been considered for use in membranes. A change in pH could change the ability of the polymer to let ions through, allowing it to act as a filter.

=== Surface modification ===
pH sensitive polymers have been used to modify the surfaces of materials. For example, they can be used to change the wettability of a surface.

=== Biomedical use ===
pH sensitive polymers have been used for drug delivery. For example, they can be used to release insulin in specific quantities.
