= List of Clarivate Citation laureates in Chemistry =

The following is a list of Clarivate Citation Laureates in chemistry, considered likely candidates to win the Nobel Prize in Chemistry. Since 2025, nineteen of the selected citation laureates starting in 2008 were eventually awarded the Nobel Prize in Chemistry: Robert H. Grubbs (2005), Roger Y. Tsien (2008), Martin Karplus (2013), Fraser Stoddart (2016), John B. Goodenough and M. Stanley Whittingham (2019), Emmanuelle Charpentier and Jennifer Doudna (2020), Benjamin List (2021), Carolyn Bertozzi, Morten P. Meldal and Karl Barry Sharpless (2022) Louis E. Brus and Moungi Bawendi (2023), David Baker, John M. Jumper and Demis Hassabis (2024), and Susumu Kitagawa and Omar M. Yaghi (2025).

== Laureates ==
	Citation Laureates	Nationality	Motivations	Institute
2002–2005
^{2005}	Robert H. Grubbs (1942–2021)	United States	"for discovery catalysts for olefin metathesis in organic synthesis."	California Institute of Technology
	Ad Bax (born 1956)	Netherlands	"for research on nuclear magnetic resonance spectroscopy of proteins."	National Institute of Diabetes and Digestive and Kidney Diseases
	Kyriacos C. Nicolaou (born 1946)	Cyprus; United States	"for his contributions on natural products total synthesis and the synthesis of many complex molecules found Taxol."	University of California, San Diego
	George M. Whitesides (born 1939)	United States	"for pioneering research into molecular self-assembly that promises to lead to significant advances in nanoscale machine manufacturing and microelectronics."	Harvard University
	Seiji Shinkai (born 1944)	Japan	"for pioneering research into molecular self-assembly that promises to lead to significant advances in nanoscale machine manufacturing and microelectronics."	Kyushu University
^{2016}	Fraser Stoddart (1942–2024)	United Kingdom; United States	"for pioneering research into molecular self-assembly that promises to lead to significant advances in nanoscale machine manufacturing and microelectronics."	University of California, Los Angeles
2006
	Gerald Crabtree (born 1946)	United States	"for contributions on small molecular chemical biology."	Stanford University
	Stuart Schreiber (born 1956)	United States	"for contributions on small molecular chemical biology."	Harvard University
	Tobin J. Marks (born 1944)	United States	"for research are synthetic organo-f-element and early-transition metal organometallic chemistry."	Northwestern University
—N/a	David A. Evans (1941–2022)	United States	"for research in the synthesis of key natural products in organic chemistry."	California Institute of Technology
	Steven V. Ley (born 1945)	United States	"for research in the synthesis of key natural products in organic chemistry."	University of Cambridge
2007
	Samuel J. Danishefsky (born 1936)	United States	"for research in synthesizing the many complex organic compounds, epothilones and calicheamicin, which are natural products with promise as anti-cancer agents."	Columbia University
	Dieter Seebach (born 1937)	Germany	"for contributions on synthetic organic methods."	University of Giessen; ETH Zurich
	Barry Trost (born 1941)	United States	"for contributions on organometallic and bio-organic chemistry (Tsuji–Trost reaction, Trost ligand, Atom economy)."	Stanford University
2008
	Charles M. Lieber (born 1959)	United States	"for his transformational research on nanowires, nanomaterials, and their applications."	Harvard University
	Krzysztof Matyjaszewski (born 1950)	Poland; United States	"for his development of atom transfer radical polymerization (ATRP) and other methods of "living" polymerization."	Carnegie Mellon University
^{2008}	Roger Y. Tsien (1952–2016)	United States	"for his development and application of fluorescent protein probes as visual indicators of cellular function."	University of California, San Diego; Howard Hughes Medical Institute
2009
	Michael Grätzel (born 1944)	Switzerland	"for his invention of dye-sensitized solar cells, now known as Grätzel cells."	ETH Zurich
	Jacqueline Barton (born 1952)	United States	"for their pioneering research of electron charge transfer in DNA."	California Institute of Technology
	Bernd Giese (born 1940)	Germany	"for their pioneering research of electron charge transfer in DNA."	University of Basel
	Gary Schuster (born 1946)	United States	"for their pioneering research of electron charge transfer in DNA."	Georgia Institute of Technology
^{2021}	Benjamin List (born 1968)	Germany	"for his development of organic asymmetric catalysis using enamines."	University of Cologne; Max Planck Institute for Coal Research
2010
	Patrick O. Brown (born 1954)	United States	"for the invention and application of DNA microarrays, a revolutionary tool in the study of variation in gene expression."	Stanford University; Howard Hughes Medical Institute
^{2025}	Susumu Kitagawa (born 1951)	Japan	"for the design and development of porous metal-organic frameworks, whose applications include hydrogen and methane storage, gas purification, and gas separation, among others."	Kyoto University
^{2025}	Omar M. Yaghi (born 1965)	Jordan; United States	"for the design and development of porous metal-organic frameworks, whose applications include hydrogen and methane storage, gas purification, and gas separation, among others."	University of California, Los Angeles
	Stephen J. Lippard (born 1940)	United States	"for pioneering research in bioinorganic chemistry, including the discovery of metallointercalators to disrupt DNA replication, an important contribution to improved cancer therapy."	Massachusetts Institute of Technology
2011
—N/a	Allen J. Bard (1933–2024)	United States	"for the development and application of scanning electrochemical microscopy."	University of Texas at Austin
^{2013}	Martin Karplus (1930–2024)	Austria; United States	"for pioneering simulations of the molecular dynamics of biomolecules."	Harvard University; Louis Pasteur University
	Jean Fréchet (born 1944)	France; United States	"for the invention and development of dendritic polymers."	University of California, Berkeley; King Abdullah University of Science and Technology
	Donald Tomalia (born 1938)	United States	"for the invention and development of dendritic polymers."	Central Michigan University; Dendritic Nanotechnologies, Inc.
—N/a	Fritz Vögtle (1939–2017)	Germany	"for the invention and development of dendritic polymers."	University of Bonn
2012
^{2023}	Louis E. Brus (1943–2026)	United States	"for discovery of colloidal semiconductor nanocrystals (quantum dots)."	Columbia University
	Akira Fujishima (born 1942)	Japan	"for the discovery of photocatalytic properties of titanium dioxide (the Honda-Fujishima Effect)."	Tokyo University of Science
—N/a	Masatake Haruta (1947–2022)	Japan	"for independent foundational discoveries of catalysis by gold."	Tokyo Metropolitan University
	Graham Hutchings (born 1951)	United Kingdom	"for independent foundational discoveries of catalysis by gold."	Cardiff University
2013
	Paul Alivisatos (born 1959)	United States	"for contributions to DNA nanotechnology."	University of California, Berkeley
	Chad Mirkin (born 1963)	United States	"for contributions to DNA nanotechnology."	Northwestern University
—N/a	Nadrian Seeman (1945–2021)	United States	"for contributions to DNA nanotechnology."	New York University
—N/a	Bruce Ames (1928–2024)	United States	"for the invention of the Ames test of mutagenicity."	Children's Hospital Oakland Research Institute; University of California, Berkeley
	M.G. Finn (born 1958)	United States	"for the development of modular click chemistry."	Georgia Institute of Technology
	Valery V. Fokin (born 1971)	United States	"for the development of modular click chemistry."	Scripps Research Institute
^{2001}^{2022}	Karl Barry Sharpless (born 1941)	United States	"for the development of modular click chemistry."	Scripps Research Institute
2014
	Charles T. Kresge (born 1954)	United States	"for design of functional mesoporous materials."	Saudi Aramco
	Ryoo Ryong (born 1955)	South Korea	"for design of functional mesoporous materials."	Korea Advanced Institute of Science and Technology
	Galen D. Stucky (born 1936)	United States	"for design of functional mesoporous materials."	University of California, Santa Barbara
	Graeme Moad (born 1952)	Australia	"for development of the reversible addition-fragmentation chain transfer (RAFT) polymerization process."	Commonwealth Scientific and Industrial Research Organisation
	Ezio Rizzardo (born 1943)	Australia	"for development of the reversible addition-fragmentation chain transfer (RAFT) polymerization process."	Commonwealth Scientific and Industrial Research Organisation
	San Thang (born 1954)	Australia	"for development of the reversible addition-fragmentation chain transfer (RAFT) polymerization process."	Commonwealth Scientific and Industrial Research Organisation
	Ching Wan Tang (born 1947)	Hong Kong; United States	"for their invention of the organic light emitting diode."	University of Rochester; Hong Kong University of Science and Technology
	Steven Van Slyke (born 1956)	United States	"for their invention of the organic light emitting diode."	Kateeva
2015
^{2022}	Carolyn Bertozzi (born 1966)	United States	"for foundational contributions to bioorthogonal chemistry."	Stanford University; Howard Hughes Medical Institute
^{2020}	Emmanuelle Charpentier (born 1968)	France	"for the development of the CRISPR-cas9 method for genome editing."	Umeå University; Max Planck Institute for Infection Biology
^{2020}	Jennifer Doudna (born 1964)	United States	"for the development of the CRISPR-cas9 method for genome editing."	University of California, Berkeley; Howard Hughes Medical Institute
^{2019}	John B. Goodenough (1922–2023)	United States	"for pioneering research leading to the development of the lithium-ion battery."	University of Texas at Austin
^{2019}	M. Stanley Whittingham (born 1941)	United Kingdom; United States	"for pioneering research leading to the development of the lithium-ion battery."	Birmingham University
2016
	George Church (born 1954)	United States	"for application of CRISPR-cas9 gene editing in mouse and human cells."	Harvard Medical School
	Feng Zhang (born 1981)	China; United States	"for application of CRISPR-cas9 gene editing in mouse and human cells."	Broad Institute; Massachusetts Institute of Technology
	Dennis Lo Yuk-Ming (born 1963)	Hong Kong	"for detecting cell-free fetal DNA in maternal plasma, a revolution in noninvasive prenatal testing."	Chinese University of Hong Kong
—N/a	Hiroshi Maeda (1938–2021)	Japan	"for discovering the enhanced permeability and retention (EPR) effect of macromolecular drugs, a key finding for cancer therapeutics."	Kumamoto University
	Yasuhiro Matsumura (born 1955)	Japan	"for discovering the enhanced permeability and retention (EPR) effect of macromolecular drugs, a key finding for cancer therapeutics."	National Cancer Center
2017
	John E. Bercaw (born 1944)	United States	"for critical contributions to C-H functionalization."	California Institute of Technology
	Robert G. Bergman (born 1942)	United States	"for critical contributions to C-H functionalization."	University of California, Berkeley
—N/a	Georgiy B. Shul'pin (1946–2023)	Russia	"for critical contributions to C-H functionalization."	Russian Academy of Sciences
	Jens Nørskov (born 1952)	Denmark	"for fundamental advances, theoretical and practical, in heterogeneous catalysis on solid surfaces."	Technical University of Denmark; Stanford University
	Tsutomu Miyasaka (born 1953)	Japan	"for their discovery and application of perovskite materials to achieve efficient energy conversion."	Toin University of Yokohama
	Nam-Gyu Park (born 1960)	South Korea	"for their discovery and application of perovskite materials to achieve efficient energy conversion."	Sungkyunkwan University
	Henry Snaith (born 1978)	United Kingdom	"for their discovery and application of perovskite materials to achieve efficient energy conversion."	University of Oxford
2018
	Eric Jacobsen (born 1960)	United States	"for contributions to catalytic reactions for organic synthesis, especially for the development of Jacobsen epoxidation."	Harvard University
—N/a	George M. Sheldrick (1942–2025)	United Kingdom	"for his enormous influence in structural crystallography."	University of Göttingen
	JoAnne Stubbe (born 1946)	United States	"for her discovery that ribonucleotide reductases transform ribonucleotides into deoxyribonucleotides by a free-radical mechanism."	Massachusetts Institute of Technology
2019
—N/a	Rolf Huisgen (1920–2020)	Germany	"for development of the 1,3-Dipolar cycloaddition Reaction (Huisgen reaction) and the variant Copper(I)-catalyzed Azide-Alkyne cycloaddition (Meldal)."	LMU Munich
^{2022}	Morten P. Meldal (born 1954)	Denmark	"for development of the 1,3-Dipolar cycloaddition Reaction (Huisgen reaction) and the variant Copper(I)-catalyzed Azide-Alkyne cycloaddition (Meldal)."	University of Copenhagen
	Edwin Southern (born 1938)	United Kingdom	"for invention of the Southern blot method for determining specific DNA sequences."	University of Oxford
	Marvin H. Caruthers (born 1940)	United States	"for contributions to protein and DNA sequencing and synthesis."	University of Colorado
	Leroy Hood (born 1938)	United States	"for contributions to protein and DNA sequencing and synthesis."	Institute for Systems Biology; Providence St. Joseph Health
	Michael Hunkapiller (born 1948)	United States	"for contributions to protein and DNA sequencing and synthesis."	Pacific Biosciences
2020
^{2023}	Moungi Bawendi (born 1961)	United States	"for synthesis of nanocrystals with precise attributes for a wide range of applications in physical, biological, and medical systems."	Massachusetts Institute of Technology
	Christopher B. Murray (born ?)	United States	"for synthesis of nanocrystals with precise attributes for a wide range of applications in physical, biological, and medical systems."	University of Pennsylvania
	Hyeon Taeghwan (born 1964)	South Korea	"for synthesis of nanocrystals with precise attributes for a wide range of applications in physical, biological, and medical systems."	Seoul National University; Institute for Basic Science
	Stephen L. Buchwald (born 1955)	United States	"for contributions to organometallic chemistry, notably the Buchwald–Hartwig amination which forms carbon–nitrogen bonds through palladium-catalyzed coupling reactions of amines with aryl halides."	Massachusetts Institute of Technology
	John F. Hartwig (born 1964)	United States	"for contributions to organometallic chemistry, notably the Buchwald–Hartwig amination which forms carbon–nitrogen bonds through palladium-catalyzed coupling reactions of amines with aryl halides."	University of California, Berkeley
	Makoto Fujita (born 1957)	Japan	"for advances in supramolecular chemistry through self-assembly strategies that take inspiration from nature itself."	University of Tokyo
2021
	Barry Halliwell (born 1949)	United Kingdom	"for pioneering research in free-radical chemistry including the role of free radicals and antioxidants in human disease."	National University of Singapore; Yong Loo Lin School of Medicine
	William L. Jorgensen (born 1949)	United States	"for methods and studies in the computational chemistry of organic and biomolecular systems in solution, contributing to rational drug design and synthesis."	Yale University
	Mitsuo Sawamoto (born 1954)	Japan	"for discovery and development of metal-catalyzed living radical polymerization."	Chubu University; Kyoto University
2022
	Zhenan Bao (born 1970)	China; United States	"for the development of novel biomimetic applications of organic and polymeric electronic materials, including flexible 'electronic skin'."	Stanford University
	Bonnie Bassler (born 1962)	United States	"for research on regulation of gene expression in bacteria through quorum sensing, a chemical communication system."	Princeton University; Howard Hughes Medical Institute
	Everett Peter Greenberg (born 1948)	United States	"for research on regulation of gene expression in bacteria through quorum sensing, a chemical communication system."	University of Washington
	Daniel G. Nocera (born 1957)	United States	"for fundamental experimental and theoretical contributions to proton-coupled electron transfer (PCET) and its application to energy science and biology."	Harvard University
2023
	James J. Collins (born 1965)	United States	"for pioneering work on synthetic gene circuits, which launched the field of synthetic biology."	Massachusetts Institute of Technology
	Michael Elowitz (born 1970)	United States	"for pioneering work on synthetic gene circuits, which launched the field of synthetic biology."	California Institute of Technology, Pasadena
	Stanislas Leibler (born 1957)	United States	"for pioneering work on synthetic gene circuits, which launched the field of synthetic biology."	Institute for Advanced Study, Princeton
	Shankar Balasubramanian (born 1966)	india United Kingdom	"for the co-invention of next-generation DNA sequencing methodology that has revolutionized biological research."	University of Cambridge, Cambridge
	David Klenerman (born 1959)	United Kingdom	"for the co-invention of next-generation DNA sequencing methodology that has revolutionized biological research."	University of Cambridge, Cambridge
	Kazunori Kataoka (born 1950)	Japan	"for the development of innovative drug and gene targeting and delivery methods."	University of Tokyo
	Vladimir P. Torchilin (born 1946)	United States	"for the development of innovative drug and gene targeting and delivery methods."	Northeastern University, Boston
	Karen L. Wooley (born 1966)	United States	"for the development of innovative drug and gene targeting and delivery methods."	Texas A&M University
2024
^{2024}	David Baker (born 1962)	United States	"for contributions to the prediction and design of three-dimensional protein structures and functions."	Howard Hughes Medical Institute; University of Washington School of Medicine
^{2024}	John M. Jumper (born 1985)	United States	"for contributions to the prediction and design of three-dimensional protein structures and functions."	Google DeepMind
^{2024}	Demis Hassabis (born 1976)	United States	"for contributions to the prediction and design of three-dimensional protein structures and functions."	Google DeepMind
	Kazunari Dōmen (born 1953)	Japan	"for fundamental research on photocatalysts for water splitting and the construction of solar hydrogen production systems."	Shinshu University; University of Tokyo
	Roberto Car (born 1947)	Italy	"for the Car–Parrinello method for calculating ab-initio molecular dynamics, a revolution in computational chemistry."	Princeton University
	Michele Parrinello (born 1945)	Italy	"for the Car–Parrinello method for calculating ab-initio molecular dynamics, a revolution in computational chemistry."	Università della Svizzera italiana ETH Zurich
2025
	Clifford P. Brangwynne (born 1978)	United States	"for discoveries on the role of phase-separated biomolecular condensates in biochemical organization of the cell."	Princeton University
	Anthony A. Hyman (born 1962)	United Kingdom	"for discoveries on the role of phase-separated biomolecular condensates in biochemical organization of the cell."	Max Planck Institute of Molecular Cell Biology and Genetics
	Michael K. Rosen (born 1965)	United States	"for discoveries on the role of phase-separated biomolecular condensates in biochemical organization of the cell."	University of Texas Southwestern Medical Center
	Jean-Marie Tarascon (born 1953)	France	"for fundamental advances and novel applications in energy storage and conversion technology."	Collège de France
	Tao Zhang (born 1963)	China	"for seminal contributions to the development of Single-Atom Catalysis and applications."	Chinese Academy of Sciences
2026
	David L. Allara (born 1937)	United States	"for development of self-assembled monolayers (SAMS)."	Pennsylvania State University
	Ralph G. Nuzzo (born 1954)	United States	"for development of self-assembled monolayers (SAMS)."	University of Illinois at Urbana-Champaign
	Jacob Sagiv (born 1945)	Israel	"for development of self-assembled monolayers (SAMS)."	Weizmann Institute of Science
	Harry B. Gray (born 1935)	United States	"for advancing understanding of long-range electron transfer in proteins."	California Institute of Technology
	Jay R. Winkler (born 1956)	United States	"for advancing understanding of long-range electron transfer in proteins."	California Institute of Technology
	David R. Liu (born 1973)	United States	"for developing base editing and prime editing, precision gene editing technologies that directly edit DNA in living systems, revolutionizing the life sciences and enabling life-saving programmable medicines."	Harvard University; Broad Institute; Howard Hughes Medical Institute
