= Shulpin =

Shulpin (or Shul'pin, Russian: Шульпи́н) is a Russian surname. Notable persons with the surname include:

- Georgiy Borisovich Shul’pin (born 1946), Russian chemist
- Leonid Mikhailovich Shulpin (1905–1941), Russian-Soviet ornithologist
