= Eumicrotremus tokranovi =

Scientific classification
- Kingdom: Animalia
- Phylum: Chordata
- Class: Actinopterygii
- Order: Perciformes
- Suborder: Cottoidei
- Family: Cyclopteridae
- Genus: Eumicrotremus
- Species: E. tokranovi

Binomial name
- Eumicrotremus tokranovi (Voskoboinikova, 2015)

Synonyms
- Microancathus tokranovi Voskoboinikova, 2015

Species of lumpfish

Eumicrotremus tokranovi is a species of lumpfish native to the Northwest Pacific, and one of two species some authorities place in the genus Microancathus. It is known from the Kuril Islands. It is distinguished from the closely related E. fedorovi by a taller body and flatter and less developed bone plaques. FishBase does not recognize the genus Microancathus, . This species was described by the Russian ichthyologist Olga Stepanovna Voskoboinikova in 2015 in the proposed new genus, Microancathus and the reclassification of M. fedorovi in that genus. Catalog of Fishes does not recognize the new genus and classifies this species in Eumicrotremus.

== Etymology ==
The specific name honors the ichthyologist Alexei Mikhailovich Tokranovof the Kamchatka Branch of the Pacific Institute of Geography and the Far East Branch of the Russian Academy of Sciences.
