= Cherie Kagan =

American nanotechnologist and academic (born 1969)

- Born: 1969 (age 56–57)
- Education: University of Pennsylvania (BSE, BA); MIT (PhD)
- Spouse: Christopher B. Murray
- Scientific career
- Fields: Chemistry
- Workplaces: University of Pennsylvania
- Thesis: The electronic and optical properties of close packed cadmium selenide quantum dot solids (1996)
- Doctoral advisor: Moungi Bawendi

Cherie R. Kagan (b. 1969, Manhasset, New York) is the Stephen J. Angello Professor of Electrical and Systems Engineering, Professor of Materials Science and Engineering, and Professor of Chemistry at the University of Pennsylvania. Kagan is an Associate Editor of ACS Nano and serves on the editorial boards of Nano Letters and NanoToday.

== Education and career ==
Kagan graduated from the University of Pennsylvania in 1991 with a BSE in Materials Science and Engineering and a BA Mathematics. She earned her PhD in Materials Science and Engineering from the Massachusetts Institute of Technology in 1996 working with Moungi Bawendi. In 1996, she went to Bell Labs as a postdoctoral fellow. In 1998, Kagan joined IBM’s T. J. Watson Research Center, where she most recently managed the “Molecular Assemblies and Devices Group.” In 2006, it was announced that she would join the faculty of the University of Pennsylvania.

Kagan is co-director of The Penn Center for Energy Innovation and serves on the World Economic Forum, Global Agenda Council on Nanotechnology; on the U.S. Department of Energy, Basic Energy Sciences Materials Council; and on the advisory board of the US Summer Schools in Condensed Matter and Materials Physics. She served on the Materials Research Society’s Board of Directors from 2007-2009 and the editorial board of the ACS Applied Materials and Interfaces from 2008-2011.

== Awards and honors ==
- MIT Technology Review TR10 (2000)
- ACS Top 12 Young Women at the Forefront of Chemistry (2002)
- IBM Outstanding Technical Achievement Award (2005)
- Stanford University’s Distinguished Women in Science Colloquium (2009)
- Fellow of the American Physical Society (2013)
- S. Reid Warren, Jr Award (2015)
- 2021 Fellow of the National Academy of Inventors
