= Eumicrotremus tartaricus =

Scientific classification
- Domain: Eukaryota
- Kingdom: Animalia
- Phylum: Chordata
- Class: Actinopterygii
- Order: Perciformes
- Suborder: Cottoidei
- Family: Cyclopteridae
- Genus: Eumicrotremus
- Species: E. tartaricus

Binomial name
- Eumicrotremus tartaricus Lindberg & Legeza

Synonyms
- Eumicrotremus orbis tartaricus Lindberg & Legeza, 1955

Species of lumpfish

Eumicrotremus tartaricus is a species of lumpfish native to the Northwest Pacific. It is known from the Sea of Japan, the Sea of Okhotsk, Peter the Great Bay, and the Pacific coast of the Kuril Islands, where it may be found at a depth range of 20 to 30 m (66 to 98 ft). It has sometimes been considered a subspecies of the Pacific spiny lumpsucker (Eumicrotremus orbis), but it is generally agreed upon that E. tartaricus represents its own distinct species.
