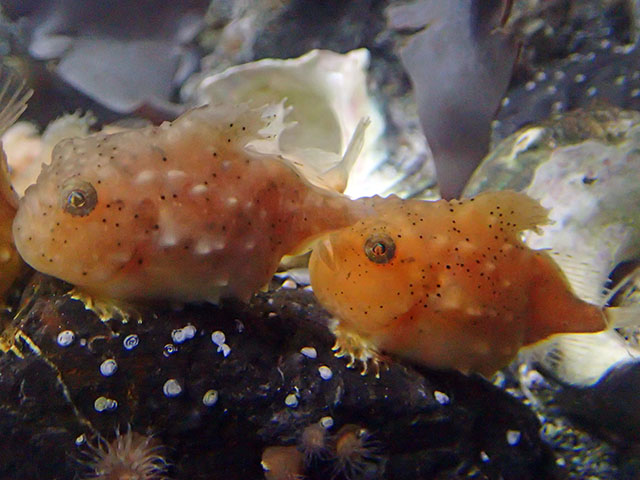

Scientific classification
- Kingdom: Animalia
- Phylum: Chordata
- Class: Actinopterygii
- Division: Teleostei
- Order: Perciformes
- Suborder: Cottoidei
- Family: Cyclopteridae
- Genus: Eumicrotremus
- Species: E. pacificus

Binomial name
- Eumicrotremus pacificus Schmidt, 1904

= Eumicrotremus pacificus =

Species of fish

Eumicrotremus pacificus, commonly known as the spotted lumpsucker or the balloon lumpfish, is a species of lumpfish (family Cyclopteridae) native to the northwestern Pacific Ocean. It occurs in the Sea of Okhotsk, the Sea of Japan, the East China Sea, and the waters off Hokkaido and the Kuril Islands.

E. pacificus may be confused with the closely related Eumicrotremus orbis, which has an overlapping distribution. However, E. pacificus is typically larger, reaching up to 20 cm (7.9 in) in total length. It is generally yellow to orange in colour with small dark spots, and its tubercles are usually smaller and less pronounced than those of E. orbis, giving it a less spiny appearance.

== Taxonomy ==
The spotted lumpsucker (Eumicrotremus pacificus) is a species belonging to the family Cyclopteridae, which includes approximately 24 species. Members of this family are part of the genus Eumicrotremus, which comprises species such as Eumicrotremus orbis (Pacific spiny lumpsucker), Eumicrotremus taranetzi, Eumicrotremus awae, and several other described species. Species within this genus are primarily distributed in the northern regions of the world’s oceans and are characterized by a spiny external skeleton and the absence of a swim bladder.

Eumicrotremus pacificus was first described by Schmidt in 1904 and is often confused with E. orbis (Pacific spiny lumpsucker) due to similarities in coloration, size, tubercles, and habitat range. However, the spotted lumpsucker is typically smaller than the Pacific spiny lumpsucker and has distinct dark spots covering its body.

== Description ==
The spotted lumpsucker (Eumicrotremus pacificus) is a species of fish in the family Cyclopteridae. E. pacificus is often confused with the Pacific spiny lumpsucker (E. orbis) due to their similar spiny appearance and overlapping distribution in the Pacific Ocean. Like other species within the family, spotted lumpsuckers possess a suction disc located on the underside of the body. This disc is a highly modified pair of pelvic fins and is a distinguishing anatomical feature of the Cyclopteridae.

The spotted lumpsucker has a globiform (rounded) body with an external bony armor. It has a ventral mouth and lacks a swim bladder. Most adult E. pacificus individuals are yellow to orange in colour, with small brown to black dots distributed across the body. Juvenile E. pacificus have been observed to exhibit darker head and body coloration, gradually developing the yellow and orange tones as they mature.

In addition to its vibrant coloration, E. pacificus possesses bony tubercles that form part of its body armor. These tubercles grow from plaques distributed across the body. The plaques are less pronounced than those of the Pacific spiny lumpsucker (E. orbis). The individual spines are set into circular bases within the bony plaques. This armor serves several functions, including camouflage, environmental protection, and drag reduction in water currents.

There are notable morphological differences between male and female E. pacificus. One distinction is the anteanal distance, which is the distance between the anal fins and the vent (anus). Females have a greater anteanal distance to accommodate the development of gonads and eggs for reproduction.

Differences have also been observed in the external skeleton between spawning and non-spawning males. During the spawning period, the external skeleton becomes less pronounced, while the jaws elongate and the overall body height increases.

== Biology ==
The spotted lumpsucker (Eumicrotremus pacificus) is a docile and generally solitary fish with limited swimming ability. There are no reliable records of its average lifespan; however, similar members of the family Cyclopteridae have been observed to live for approximately one year in aquarium settings. Spotted lumpsuckers spend most of their lives attached to rocks, aquatic vegetation, and other stable substrates using their ventral suction disc.

The function of the suction disc among Cyclopteridae species is not fully understood beyond its role in attachment to substrates. Observations suggest that it may also assist in parental care and protection of eggs.

Specific information on the diet of E. pacificus is limited. However, other Eumicrotremus species have been reported to feed on small crustaceans, mollusks, plankton, and small fish. Juvenile cyclopterids have been observed feeding on crustacean larvae and, occasionally, on the larvae of their own species.

Spotted lumpsuckers are preyed upon by hermit crabs, red king crabs, and various large fish species.

== Distribution and habitat ==
The spotted lumpsucker (Eumicrotremus pacificus) is found in the northern regions of the Pacific Ocean, primarily along coastal and tidal areas. Its recorded range includes the East China Sea, the Sea of Okhotsk, the Sea of Japan, and the waters surrounding Hokkaido and the Kuril Islands. There are no known data indicating a preference for either warm or cold water temperatures.

Research on the specific habitats occupied by E. pacificus within these regions is limited. However, other members of the family Cyclopteridae are commonly found among rocks, stones, seagrass, algae, and other solid substrates to which they can attach. Due to their limited swimming ability, spotted lumpsuckers are believed to inhabit a range of depths, including shallow coastal waters, deeper marine areas, and intertidal zones.

== Conservation status ==
Eumicrotremus pacificus in an aquarium

The spotted lumpsucker (Eumicrotremus pacificus) is not considered a threat to humans and is sometimes kept in aquariums due to its docile nature. In the wild, it remains relatively under-researched and is regarded as a cryptic species compared to other members of the Cyclopteridae family.

The species has not been evaluated by the IUCN and therefore has no official conservation status. There are currently no known immediate threats to its population; however, a lack of research limits understanding of its population dynamics and life cycle. Potential threats may include habitat loss and degradation, bycatch, and the impacts of climate change, particularly within its native range.
