= Christopher B. Murray =

American materials scientist

- Education: St. Mary's University (Halifax) (BSc); MIT (PhD)
- Known for: Hot injection synthesis of quantum dots
- Spouse: Cherie Kagan
- Awards: 1997 Nobel Laureate Signature Award (ACS); 2020 Clarivate Citation (Chemistry)
- Scientific career
- Fields: Chemistry; Nanotechnology
- Workplaces: IBM; University of Pennsylvania
- Thesis: Synthesis and Characterization of II-VI Quantum Dots and their Assembly into 3D Quantum Dot Superlattices (1995)
- Doctoral advisor: Moungi Bawendi

Christopher Bruce Murray is the Richard Perry University Professor of Chemistry and Materials Science and Engineering at the University of Pennsylvania. He is a member of the National Academy of Engineering and a Fellow of the Materials Research Society. He was a Clarivate Citation Laureate in 2020. He is known for his contributions to quantum dots and other nanoscale materials.

== Early life and education ==
Murray studied chemistry at St. Mary's University in Halifax, Nova Scotia, Canada from 1985, graduating with a Bachelor's Degree with Honors in Chemistry in 1988. He spent a year as a Rotary International Fellow at the University of Auckland in 1989. From 1990 he studied at the Massachusetts Institute of Technology (MIT), where he received his doctorate in chemistry in 1995.

== Career ==
From 1995 Murray worked at the Thomas J. Watson Research Center at IBM. From 2000 to 2006 he headed their Nanoscale Materials and Devices Department. In 2006 the University of Pennsylvania announced his appointment as the Richard Perry University Professor, with appointments in Chemistry and Materials Science, in the schools of Arts and Sciences, and Engineering and Applied Science.

== Research ==
Murray, David Norris and Manoj Nirmal were the first graduate students to work with Moungi Bawendi at MIT. As part of his thesis work, Murray helped to develop synthetic methods for making quantum dots, including identifying a longer chain version of trioctylphosphine oxide as being cheaper and having additional benefits when used in synthesis. In 1993, Murray, Norris and Bawendi published a breakthrough paper describing the hot injection synthesis method for making quantum dots. Both Murray's and Bawendi's contributions to the synthesis and characterization of semiconductor quantum dots were recognized by the American Chemical Society with its 1997 Nobel Laureate Signature Award.

Their method was both adaptable and reproducible, making it possible to consistently synthesise monodisperse nanoparticles and develop large-scale applications using quantum dots. Bawendi received the 2023 Nobel Prize in Chemistry for the development of this method.

Much of Murray's has work focused on the synthesis and characterization of nanoscale materials, including nanoscale magnets, semiconductor nanocrystals, and nanocrystal superlattices. Murray was recognized at IBM as a Master Inventor and patent evaluator. He holds at least 26 nanascale patents.

Murray is concerned with the synthesis and self-assembly properties of nanocrystals and the potential to create new mesoscopic materials with interesting properties and potential applications in energy, environmental sustainability, health, and information processing.

Murray is the Founding Chair of the World Economic Forum’s Global Councils on Nanotechnology (2008-2009) and Global Council on Emerging Technologies (2009-2010).

== Awards and honors ==
- 1997 Nobel Laureate Signature Award of the American Chemical Society (with Moungi Bawendi)
- 2000, one of the most influential innovators younger than 35, Technology Review
- 2011, honorary doctorate, Utrecht University
- 2012 Fellow, Materials Research Society, for "innovations in the synthesis of nanomaterials with precisely controlled dimensions by chemical approaches; outstanding contributions in nanoparticle self-assembly; and pioneering research in the design of nanoparticle-based devices."
- 2019, Member, National Academy of Engineering for the "invention and development of solvothermal synthesis of monodisperse nanocrystal quantum dots for displays, photovoltaics and memory."
- 2020, Clarivate Citation Laureate with Moungi G. Bawendi and Hyeon Taeghwan "For synthesis of nanocrystals with precise attributes for a wide range of applications in physical, biological, and medical systems."

== Selected publications ==
- Murray, C. B.; Norris, D. J.; Bawendi, M. G. (September 1993). "Synthesis and characterization of nearly monodisperse CdE (E = sulfur, selenium, tellurium) semiconductor nanocrystallites". Journal of the American Chemical Society. 115 (19): 8706–8715. Bibcode:1993JAChS.115.8706M. doi:10.1021/ja00072a025. ISSN 0002-7863.
- Sun, Shouheng; Murray, C. B.; Weller, Dieter; Folks, Liesl; Moser, Andreas (17 March 2000). "Monodisperse FePt Nanoparticles and Ferromagnetic FePt Nanocrystal Superlattices". Science. 287 (5460): 1989–1992. Bibcode:2000Sci...287.1989S. doi:10.1126/science.287.5460.1989. ISSN 0036-8075. PMID 10720318.
- Murray, C. B.; Kagan, C. R.; Bawendi, M. G. (August 2000). "Synthesis and Characterization of Monodisperse Nanocrystals and Close-Packed Nanocrystal Assemblies". Annual Review of Materials Science. 30 (1): 545–610. Bibcode:2000AnRMS..30..545M. doi:10.1146/annurev.matsci.30.1.545. ISSN 0084-6600.
- Murray, C. B.; Sun, Shouheng; Gaschler, W.; Doyle, H.; Betley, T. A.; Kagan, C. R. (January 2001). "Colloidal synthesis of nanocrystals and nanocrystal superlattices". IBM Journal of Research and Development. 45 (1): 47–56. doi:10.1147/rd.451.0047.
- Talapin, Dmitri V.; Murray, Christopher B. (7 October 2005). "PbSe Nanocrystal Solids for n- and p-Channel Thin Film Field-Effect Transistors". Science. 310 (5745): 86–89. Bibcode:2005Sci...310...86T. doi:10.1126/science.1116703. ISSN 0036-8075. PMID 16210533.
- Shevchenko, Elena V.; Talapin, Dmitri V.; Kotov, Nicholas A.; O'Brien, Stephen; Murray, Christopher B. (January 2006). "Structural diversity in binary nanoparticle superlattices". Nature. 439 (7072): 55–59. Bibcode:2006Natur.439...55S. doi:10.1038/nature04414. hdl:2027.42/62551. ISSN 1476-4687. PMID 16397494.
- Kumar, Prashant; Vo, Thi; Cha, Minjeong; Visheratina, Anastasia; Kim, Ji-Young; Xu, Wenqian; Schwartz, Jonathan; Simon, Alexander; Katz, Daniel; Nicu, Valentin Paul; Marino, Emanuele; Choi, Won Jin; Veksler, Michael; Chen, Si; Murray, Christopher; Hovden, Robert; Glotzer, Sharon; Kotov, Nicholas A. (March 2023). "Photonically active bowtie nanoassemblies with chirality continuum". Nature. 615 (7952): 418–424. Bibcode:2023Natur.615..418K. doi:10.1038/s41586-023-05733-1. ISSN 1476-4687. PMID 36922612.
