= Eumicrotremus schmidti =

Scientific classification
- Domain: Eukaryota
- Kingdom: Animalia
- Phylum: Chordata
- Class: Actinopterygii
- Order: Perciformes
- Suborder: Cottoidei
- Family: Cyclopteridae
- Genus: Eumicrotremus
- Species: E. schmidti

Binomial name
- Eumicrotremus schmidti Lindberg & Legeza, 1955

Species of lumpfish

Eumicrotremus schmidti is a species of lumpfish native to the Northwest Pacific. It is a demersal fish known only from the northern Sea of Okhotsk, where it is found at a depth range of 20 to 143 m (66 to 469 ft). Specimens of E. schmidti were once attributed to the related species E. andriashevi, which does not inhabit the Sea of Okhotsk. This species was first formally described in 1955 by the Soviet ichthyologists Georgii Ustinovich Lindberg and Marina Iosifovna Legeza with its type locality given as Penzhinskaya Bay in the Sea of Okhotsk in Russia. The identity of the person honoured in the specific name was not given by Lindberg and Legeza but it is likely to be Petr Yulievich Schmidt, a Russian ichthyologist.
