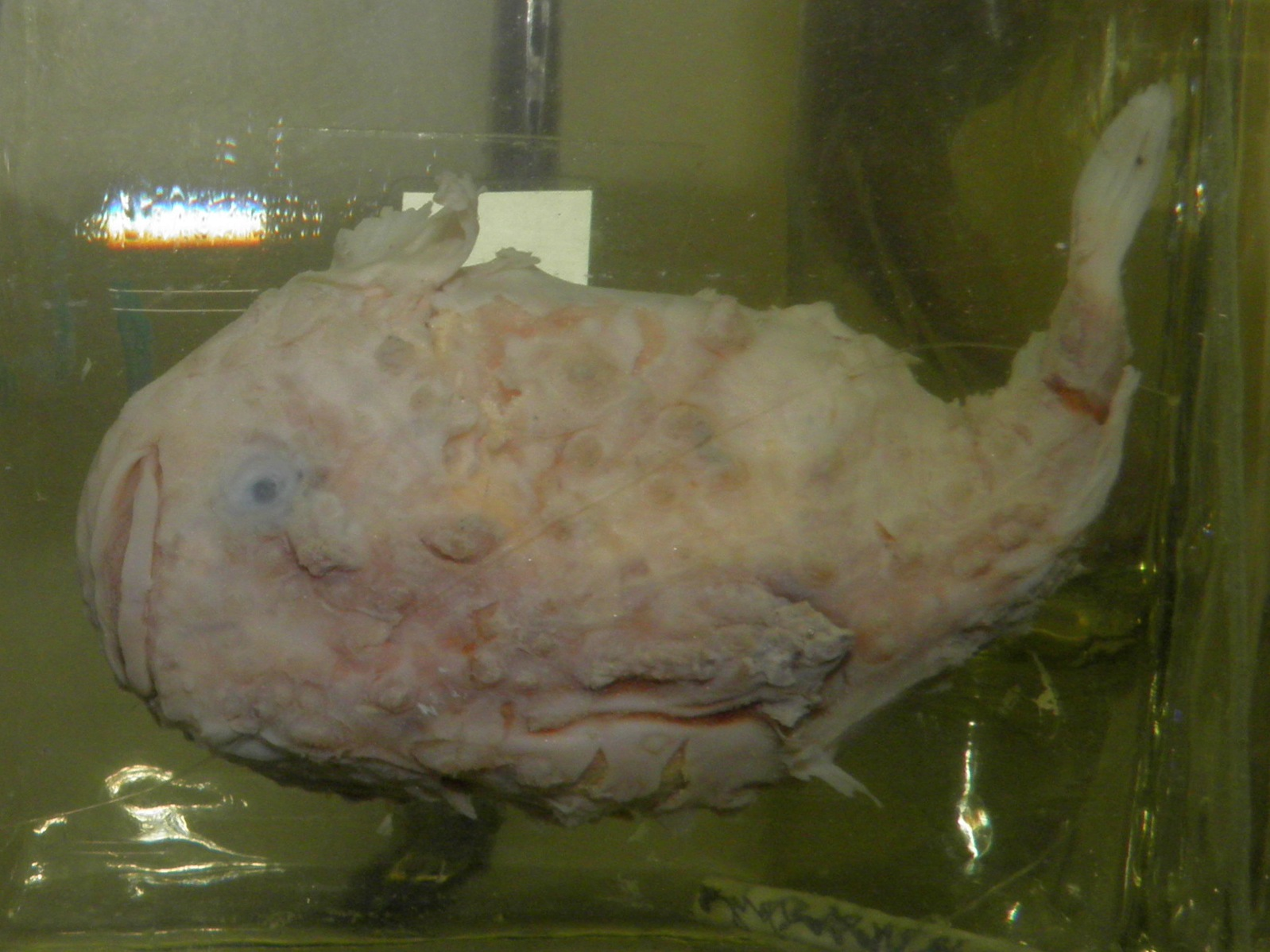
- Preserved specimen

Scientific classification
- Domain: Eukaryota
- Kingdom: Animalia
- Phylum: Chordata
- Class: Actinopterygii
- Order: Perciformes
- Suborder: Cottoidei
- Family: Cyclopteridae
- Genus: Eumicrotremus
- Species: E. derjugini

Binomial name
- Eumicrotremus derjugini Popov, 1926

= Eumicrotremus derjugini =

Species of lumpfish

Eumicrotremus derjugini, also known as the leatherfin lumpsucker or petite poule de mer Arctique (meaning "small Arctic sea hen" in French), is a species of lumpfish native to the Arctic, the North Atlantic, and the North Pacific. It is known from Labrador, Ungava Bay, Hudson Bay, the Canadian Arctic, Svalbard, the Barents Sea, Franz Josef Land, Greenland, the Kara Sea, the Laptev Sea, the East Siberian Sea, the Chukchi Sea, and the Sea of Okhotsk. It occurs at a depth range of 5 to 1038 m (16 to 3406 ft), and it reaches 10 cm (3.9 inches) SL. It is a benthic species often found on substrates of mud, gravel, or stone at temperatures below 0 °C, feeding mainly on crustaceans and Oikopleura. The young of this species are reportedly seen in shallower water.

The species name commemorates the collector Konstantin Deryugin.
