= Moungi Bawendi =

Tunisian-American-French chemist (born 1961)

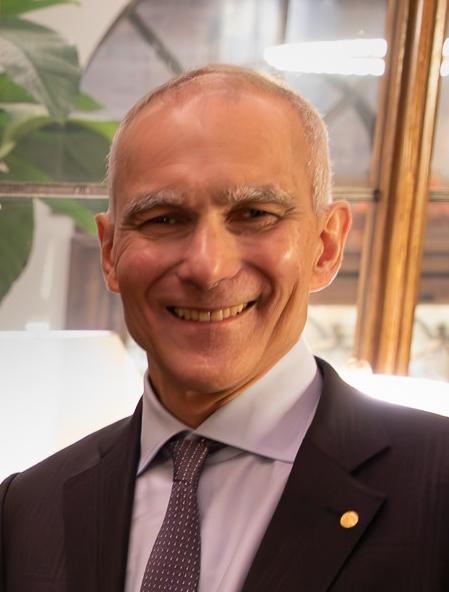
- Bawendi in 2023
- Born: 15 March 1961 (age 65); Paris, France
- Education: Harvard University (BA, MA); University of Chicago (PhD)
- Known for: hot-injection synthesis of quantum dots
- Relatives: M. Salah Baouendi (father)
- Awards: Nobel Prize in Chemistry (2023)
- Scientific career
- Fields: Chemistry; Quantum chemistry
- Workplaces: Massachusetts Institute of Technology
- Thesis: From the Biggest to the Smallest Polyatomic Molecules: Statistical Mechanics and Quantum Mechanics in Action (1988)
- Doctoral advisor: Karl Freed; Takeshi Oka
- Doctoral students: Christopher B. Murray; Cherie Kagan

Moungi Gabriel Bawendi (born 15 March 1961) is a Tunisian-French-American chemist. He is currently the Lester Wolfe Professor at the Massachusetts Institute of Technology. Bawendi is known for his advances in the chemical production of high-quality quantum dots. For this work, he was awarded the Nobel Prize in Chemistry in 2023.

== Early life ==
Moungi Bawendi was born in Paris, France, the son of Tunisian mathematician Mohammed Salah Baouendi. After periods living in France and Tunisia, Bawendi and his family migrated to the United States when he was a child. They lived in West Lafayette, Indiana, as Salah worked in the math department at Purdue University. Bawendi graduated from West Lafayette Junior-Senior High School in 1978.

=== Higher education and career ===
Bawendi received both an A.B. in 1982 and an A.M. in 1983 from Harvard University. He earned a Ph.D. in chemistry in 1988 from the University of Chicago, under the supervision of Karl Freed and Takeshi Oka.

With Freed, Bawendi worked on theoretical polymer physics, and with Oka, Bawendi worked on experiments on hot-bands of H_{3}^{+}, which played a role in deciphering the emission spectrum of Jupiter observed in 1989.

During his graduate studies, Oka recommended Bawendi to a summer program in Bell Labs, where Louis E. Brus introduced Bawendi to the research on quantum dots. Upon graduation, Bawendi went to work with Brus at Bell Labs as a postdoctoral researcher.

Bawendi joined Massachusetts Institute of Technology (MIT) in 1990 and became professor in 1996.

== Research ==
Bawendi was one of the most cited chemists of the decade from 2000 to 2010. He is a leading figure in the research and development of quantum dots. Quantum dots are tiny semiconducting crystals whose nanoscale size gives them unique optical and electronic properties.

A major challenge in quantum dot research was to find ways to create high quality quantum dots that are stable and uniform. Bawendi is recognized for his work in developing standardized methods for quantum dot synthesis. In 1993, Bawendi, and his PhD students David J. Norris and Christopher B. Murray, reported on a hot-injection synthesis method for producing reproducible quantum dots with well-defined size and with high optical quality. This breakthrough in chemical production methods made it possible to “tune” quantum dots according to size, and achieve predictable properties as a result. It gave scientists much greater control over the material, and made it possible to achieve precise and reproducible results.

The method opened the door to the development of large-scale technological applications of quantum dots in a wide range of areas. Quantum dots are now used in light-emitting diodes (LEDs), photovoltaics (solar cells), photodetectors, photoconductors, lasers, biomedical imaging, biosensing and other applications.

== Awards and honors ==
Bawendi was granted the Sloan Research Fellowship in 1994. He won the 1997 Nobel Signature Award for Graduate Education in Chemistry of American Chemical Society (ACS). In 2001, he received the Sackler Prize in Physical Chemistry of Advanced Materials. In 2006, he was awarded the Ernest Orlando Lawrence Award.

He was elected member of the American Association for the Advancement of Science in 2003, of the American Academy of Arts and Sciences in 2004, and of the National Academy of Sciences in 2007.

In 2010 during the National Meeting on March 23, 2010, Bawendi received the ACS Award in Colloid and Surface Chemistry. He also received the 2011 SEMI Award for North America for quantum dot research.

Bawendi was selected as a Clarivate Citation Laureate in Chemistry in 2020, jointly with Christopher B. Murray and Hyeon Taeghwan, "for synthesis of nanocrystals with precise attributes for a wide range of applications in physical, biological, and medical systems.".

In 2023, Bawendi was awarded the Nobel Prize in Chemistry jointly with Louis E. Brus and Alexey Ekimov "for the discovery and synthesis of quantum dots".

He was elected to the National Academy of Engineering in 2026. He was also awarded the Medal of Honor by Tunis University. In 2025, he received a Carnegie Corporation of New York Great Immigrant Award

== Decorations ==
- Grand Officier of the Order of the Republic (Tunisia, 2024)

== Personal life ==
Bawendi is married to journalist Rachel Zimmerman, widow of a computer science MIT professor, Seth J. Teller.

== Selected publications ==
- Shirasaki, Yasuhiro; Supran, Geoffrey J.; Bawendi, Moungi G.; Bulović, Vladimir (January 2013). "Emergence of colloidal quantum-dot light-emitting technologies". Nature Photonics. 7 (1): 13–23. Bibcode:2013NaPho...7...13S. doi:10.1038/nphoton.2012.328. ISSN 1749-4893. S2CID 122454511.
- Soo Choi, Hak; Liu, Wenhao; Misra, Preeti; Tanaka, Eiichi; Zimmer, John P.; Itty Ipe, Binil; Bawendi, Moungi G.; Frangioni, John V. (October 2007). "Renal clearance of quantum dots". Nature Biotechnology. 25 (10): 1165–1170. doi:10.1038/nbt1340. ISSN 1546-1696. PMC 2702539. PMID 17891134.
- Murray, C. B.; Kagan, C. R.; Bawendi, M. G. (August 2000). "Synthesis and Characterization of Monodisperse Nanocrystals and Close-Packed Nanocrystal Assemblies". Annual Review of Materials Science. 30 (1): 545–610. Bibcode:2000AnRMS..30..545M. doi:10.1146/annurev.matsci.30.1.545. ISSN 0084-6600.
- Dabbousi, B. O.; Rodriguez-Viejo, J.; Mikulec, F. V.; Heine, J. R.; Mattoussi, H.; Ober, R.; Jensen, K. F.; Bawendi, M. G. (1 November 1997). "(CdSe)ZnS Core−Shell Quantum Dots: Synthesis and Characterization of a Size Series of Highly Luminescent Nanocrystallites". The Journal of Physical Chemistry B. 101 (46): 9463–9475. doi:10.1021/jp971091y. ISSN 1520-6106.
- Murray, C. B.; Norris, D. J.; Bawendi, M. G. (September 1993). "Synthesis and characterization of nearly monodisperse CdE (E = sulfur, selenium, tellurium) semiconductor nanocrystallites". Journal of the American Chemical Society. 115 (19): 8706–8715. Bibcode:1993JAChS.115.8706M. doi:10.1021/ja00072a025. ISSN 0002-7863.
- Bawendi, M G; Steigerwald, M L; Brus, L E (October 1990). "The Quantum Mechanics of Larger Semiconductor Clusters ("Quantum Dots")". Annual Review of Physical Chemistry. 41 (1): 477–496. Bibcode:1990ARPC...41..477B. doi:10.1146/annurev.pc.41.100190.002401. ISSN 0066-426X.
