= Pacific Institute of Geography =

Research institute in Russia

The Pacific Institute of Geography of the Far Eastern Branch of the Russian Academy of Sciences (Russian:Тихоокеанский институт географии Дальневосточного отделения Российской академии наук)(abbr. TIG FEB RAS) is a research institute part of the Far Eastern Branch of the Russian Academy of Sciences founded in 1971. It is the leading scientific institution in the field of geography in the Russian Far East. It is located in Vladivostok.

== History ==
The Pacific Institute of Geography was established on October 1, 1971 at the Far Eastern Scientific Center of the USSR Academy of Sciences. Andrey Kapitsa, a scientist, geographer, and corresponding member of the USSR Academy of Sciences became the director of the institute. The main task of the new institute was to organize, conduct, and coordinate full-scale geographic studies of the Far East regions and natural geosystems in the continent-ocean transition zone.

In May 2002, the Kamchatka Institute of Ecology and Nature Management became part of the Pacific Institute of Geography, which later became the Kamchatka branch of the TIG FEB RAS.

In 2018, according to the results of the FANO assessment of the performance of scientific organizations, the institute was assigned category I in the profile "Knowledge generation".

In 2020, the institute established the scientific journal "Pacific Geography".

== Scientific departments ==
- Laboratory of Paleogeography and Geomorphology (Head - L.A. Ganzei, Ph.D.)
- Laboratory of Geochemistry (Head - Doctor of Geological Sciences V.M.Shulkin)
- Laboratory of Biogeography and Ecology (Head - Doctor of Biological Sciences S.V. Osipov )
- Laboratory for the use of natural resources in coastal regions (head - V.V. Zharikov, Ph.D.)
- Laboratory of Geoinformation Technologies and Geosystems Modeling (Head - Ph.D. S. M. Krasnopeyev)
- Laboratory of Social and Medical Geography (Head - S. A. Lozovskaya, Candidate of Biological Sciences)
- Laboratory of Territorial and Economic Structures (Head - Dr. A.V. Moshkov )
- Laboratory of Ecology and Animal Protection (Head - I.V. Seredkin, Candidate of Biological Sciences)
- Laboratory of Hydrology and Climatology (headed by V.V. Shamov, Doctor of Geology )
- Laboratory of transformations of contact geosystems (head - Ph.D. A.N.Bugaets)
- Information and Cartographic Center (Head - Ph.D. E. G. Egidarev)
- Center for Landscape and Ecological Research (head - A. N. Kachur, Candidate of Geology )
- Regional Center for Environmental Monitoring of the North-West Pacific (coordinated by Dr. A. N. Kachur )
- Kamchatka Branch of TIG FEB RAS (Director - Doctor of Biological Sciences A.M. Tokranov )
- North-Eastern scientific base of TIG FEB RAS in the village. Cherskiy (supervisor - S. A. Zimov )

vScientific and experimental base "Smychka"

- Scientific base in the village of Khrustalny (is in conservation)

== Main scientific directions ==
The main research areas of the Institute:

- The study of structure and dynamics of geographic systems in the transition zone (land-ocean) and their modeling;
- Researching the development and optimization of regional types of nature management, including coastal-marine, based on geoinformation technologies, development of regional programs for sustainable nature management;
- Studying the dynamics and interrelationships of territorial natural resource systems and territorial structures of the economy and settlement, development of programs for sustainable development of the Far Eastern regions of Russia, taking into account the integration processes in the Asia-Pacific region.

== Institute staff ==
In total, the institute employs 213 people, including 108 researchers, including:

== Institute directors ==
- 1st Director (1971-1979) - A.P. Kapitsa, Corresponding Member of the Russian Academy of Sciences, geographer and geomorphologist
- 2nd Director (1979-1991) - G. I. Khudyakov, Corresponding Member of the Russian Academy of Sciences, physical geographer, geomorphologist and geologist
- 3rd Director (1991-2016) - P. Ya. Baklanov, Academician of the Russian Academy of Sciences, economic geographer
- 4th Director (2016—2019) - V. V. Ermoshin, Ph.D. in Geography, cartographer
- 5th director (since 2019) - K. S. Ganzei, candidate of geographical sciences, geographer

== Institute scientists ==
Over the years, geographers worked at the institute.

== Directorate ==
- Scientific adviser: Baklanov Pyotr Yakovlevich - Academician of the Russian Academy of Sciences, Professor
- Director: Ganzei Kirill Sergeevich, Candidate of Geographical Sciences
- Deputy Director for Research: Zharikov Vasily Valerievich, Candidate of Geographical Sciences
- Scientific secretary: Lyaschevskaya Marina Sergeevna, candidate of geographical sciences
