= Eumicrotremus asperrimus =

Scientific classification
- Domain: Eukaryota
- Kingdom: Animalia
- Phylum: Chordata
- Class: Actinopterygii
- Order: Perciformes
- Suborder: Cottoidei
- Family: Cyclopteridae
- Genus: Eumicrotremus
- Species: E. asperrimus

Binomial name
- Eumicrotremus asperrimus S. Tanaka (I), 1912

Species of lumpfish

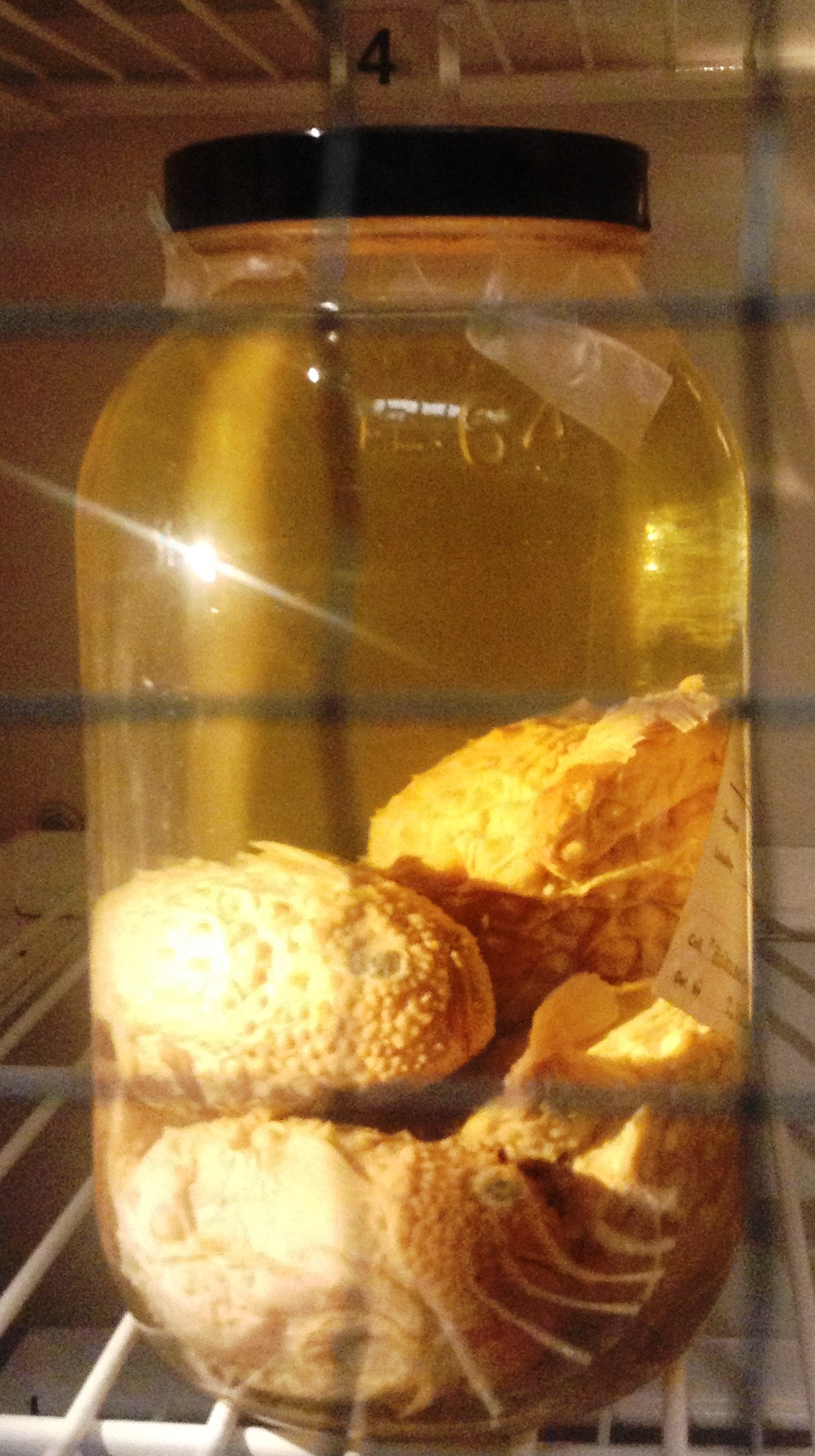
Several preserved Siberian lumpsuckers.

Eumicrotremus asperrimus, also known as the Siberian lumpsucker, is a species of lumpfish native to the Northwest Pacific, where it can be found in the Bering Sea, the Sea of Japan, the Sea of Okhotsk, as well as off of Alaska and Hokkaido. It reaches 12 cm (4.7 in) in total length and occurs at a depth range of 20 to 900 m (66 to 2953 ft). It is a round and compact fish adorned with many distinct tubercles.
