= Karl Freed =

American theoretical chemist

- Born: Karl Frederick Freed; September 25, 1942
- Died: January 11, 2026 (aged 83)
- Education: Columbia University (BS); Harvard University (PhD)
- Scientific career
- Fields: Polymer physics Biophysics; Chemical physics Theoretical chemistry
- Workplaces: University of Manchester; University of Chicago
- Thesis: Theoretical studies in molecular spectroscopy (1967)
- Doctoral students: John M. Jumper; Moungi Bawendi
- Website: chemistry.uchicago.edu/faculty/karl-freed

Karl Frederick Freed (September 25, 1942 - January 11, 2026) was an American theoretical chemist recognized for his research in polymer physics. Freed spent his independent academic career in the department of chemistry and the James Frank Institute at the University of Chicago, where retired as the Henry G. Gale Distinguished Service Professor emeritus. He was a member of the American Academy of Arts and Sciences, a Fellow of the American Physical Society, and was awarded the Polymer Physics Prize of the American Physical Society in 2014 and the Award in Pure Chemistry by the American Chemical Society in 1976.

== Education ==
- Stuyvesant High School
- Columbia University, B.S., 1963
- Harvard University, A.M., 1965; Ph.D., 1967 (with William Klemperer)

== Career and research ==
Freed was a NATO Postdoctoral Fellow at the University of Manchester from 1967-1968.

Two of Freed's former doctoral students have been awarded the Nobel Prize in Chemistry: Moungi Bawendi in 2023 and John M. Jumper in 2024.
