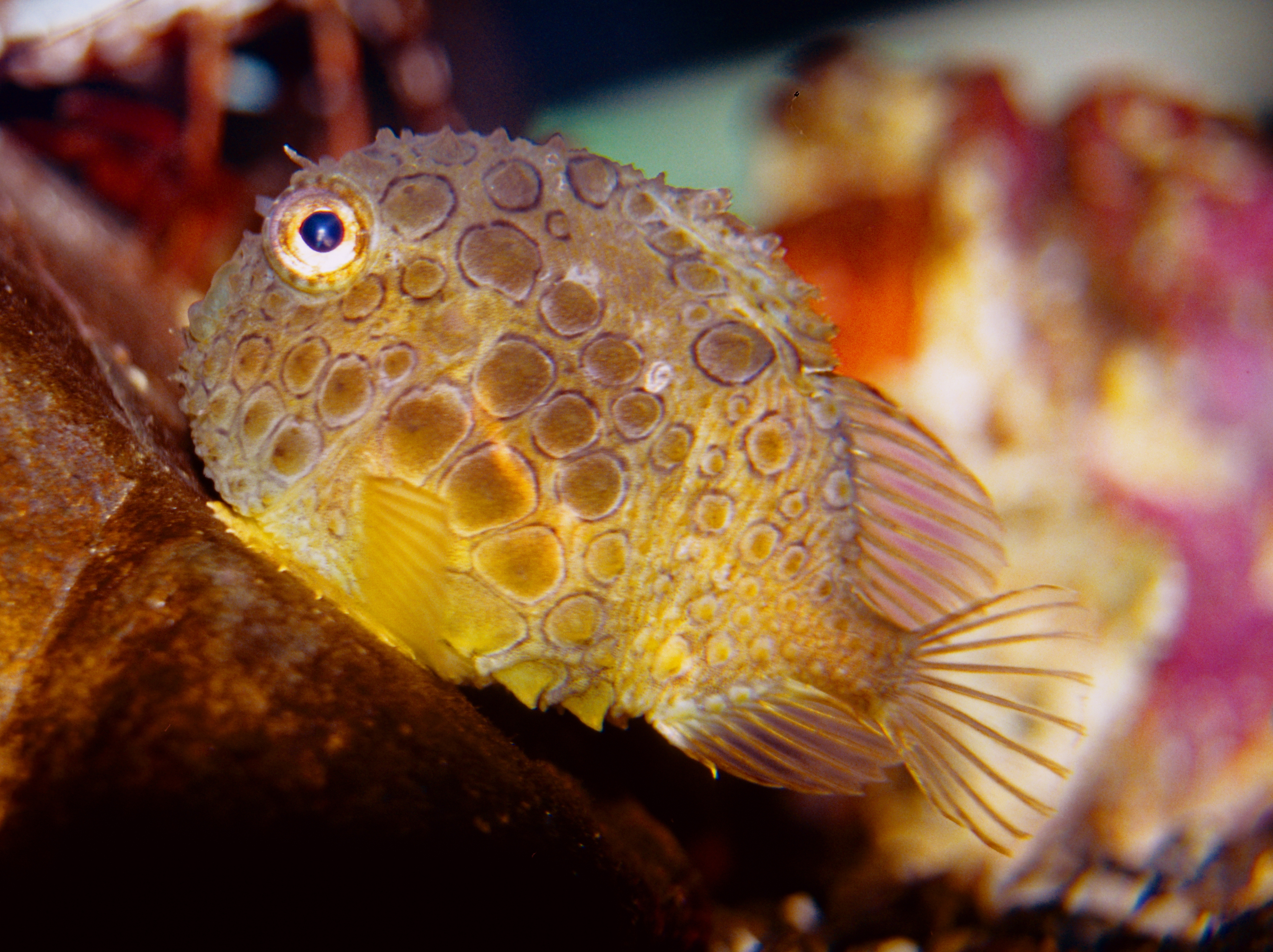
- Eumicrotremus orbis
- Eumicrotremus pacificus

Scientific classification
- Kingdom: Animalia
- Phylum: Chordata
- Class: Actinopterygii
- Order: Perciformes
- Suborder: Cottoidei
- Family: Cyclopteridae
- Genus: Eumicrotremus; T. N. Gill, 1862

Type species
- Cyclopterus spinosus J. C. Fabricius, 1776

Genera
- See text

Synonyms
- Cyclolumpus Tanaka, 1912; Cyclopterocottus Popov, 1930; Cyclopteroides Garman, 1892; Cyclopteropsis Soldatov & Popov, 1929; Georgimarinus Voskoboinikova & Nazarkin, 2015; Microancathus Voskoboinikova, 2015

= Eumicrotremus =

Genus of fishes

Eumicrotremus is a genus of lumpfishes native to the northern oceans. The name for this genus comes from the Greek roots eu meaning "good", mikros meaning "small" or "little", and trema meaning "hole".

== Taxonomy ==
Eumicrotremus was first proposed as a genus in 1862 by the American biologist Theodore Gill with Johan Christian Fabricius's Cyclopterus spinosus as its type species. The 5th edition of Fishes of the World does not recognize subfamilies within the Cyclopteridae, however, other authorities place this genus in the subfamily Eumicrotreminae.

== Species ==
There are currently 18 recognized species in this genus:

- Eumicrotremus andriashevi Perminov, 1936
  - E. a. aculeatus Voskoboinikova & Nazarkin, 2015 (Andriashev's spicular-spiny pimpled lumpsucker)
  - E. a. andriashevi Perminov, 1936 (Andriashev's spiny pimpled lumpsucker)
- Eumicrotremus asperrimus (S. Tanaka (I), 1912)
- Eumicrotremus awae (Jordan & Snyder, 1902)
- Eumicrotremus barbatus (Lindberg & Legeza 1955)
- Eumicrotremus bergi Popov, 1929
- Eumicrotremus brashnikowi (P. J. Schmidt, 1904)
- Eumicrotremus derjugini Popov, 1926 (Leather-fin lumpsucker)
- Eumicrotremus fedorovi (Mandritsa, 1991) (Fedorov's lumpsucker)
- Eumicrotremus gyrinops (Garman, 1892)
- Eumicrotremus jindoensis S. J. Lee, J.-K. Kim, Y. Kai, S. Ikeguchi, & T. Nakabo, 2017
- Eumicrotremus inarmatus Mednikov (ru) & Prokhorov, 1956 (Bumpy lumpsucker)
- Eumicrotremus jordani Soldatov, 1929 (Smooth lumpfish)
- Eumicrotremus lindbergi Soldatov, 1930
- Eumicrotremus mcalpini (Fowler, 1914) (Arctic lumpsucker)
- Eumicrotremus multituberculatus Voskoboinikova 2018
- Eumicrotremus ochotonensis Popov 1928
- Eumicrotremus orbis (Günther, 1861) (Pacific spiny lumpsucker)
- Eumicrotremus pacificus P. Y. Schmidt, 1904
- Eumicrotremus phrynoides C. H. Gilbert & Burke, 1912 (Toad lumpsucker)
- Eumicrotremus popovi Soldatov, 1929
- Eumicrotremus schmidti Lindberg & Legeza, 1955
- Eumicrotremus spinosus (J. C. Fabricius, 1776) (Atlantic spiny lumpsucker)
- Eumicrotremus taranetzi Perminov, 1936
- Eumicrotremus tartaricus Lindberg & Legeza, 1955
- Eumicrotremus terraenovae G. S. Myers & J. E. Böhlke, 1950
- Eumicrotremus tokranovi Voskoboinikova, 2015 (Tokranov's lumpsucker)
- Eumicrotremus uenoi S. J. Lee, J.-K. Kim, Y. Kai, S. Ikeguchi, & T. Nakabo, 2017
