= Graeme Moad =

Australian chemist

Graeme Moad AC FAA FTSE FRS
- Born: 25 June 1952 (age 74); Orange, New South Wales
- Education: University of Adelaide
- Known for: polymer design and synthesis
- Awards: AC (2022)
- Scientific career
- Fields: polymer chemistry
- Workplaces: CSIRO

Graeme Moad AC FAA FTSE FRS (born 25 June 1952) is an Australian polymer chemist.

== Education and career ==
Moad received a Bachelor of Science in 1974 and a Ph.D. in 1977, both from the University of Adelaide. He followed this with postdoctoral research at Pennsylvania State University.

In 1979 he joined the CSIRO in Melbourne; CSIRO is Australia's largest scientific research organisation. He has made substantial contributions to the theory of free radical polymerization, and he was co-author with David Solomon of the definitive reference book: The Chemistry of Radical Polymerization (Moad & Solomon, 2006). With fellow CSIRO polymer chemists Ezio Rizzardo and San Thang he is a co-developer of the RAFT process.

== Honours and awards ==
In 2012 Moad received the Battaerd-Jordan Polymer Medal, and was also elected a Fellow of the Australian Academy of Science. In 2020 he was awarded their David Craig Medal and Lecture.

In 2014, he shared the ATSE Clunies-Ross Award with San Thang and Ezio Rizzardo. He was elected a Fellow of the Australian Academy of Technology and Engineering in 2021. Moad was appointed Companion of the Order of Australia (AC) in the 2022 Australia Day Honours for "eminent service to science, particularly polymer design and synthesis and radical polymerization, education through mentoring, and to professional scientific organisations". He was elected a Fellow of the Royal Society in 2023.
