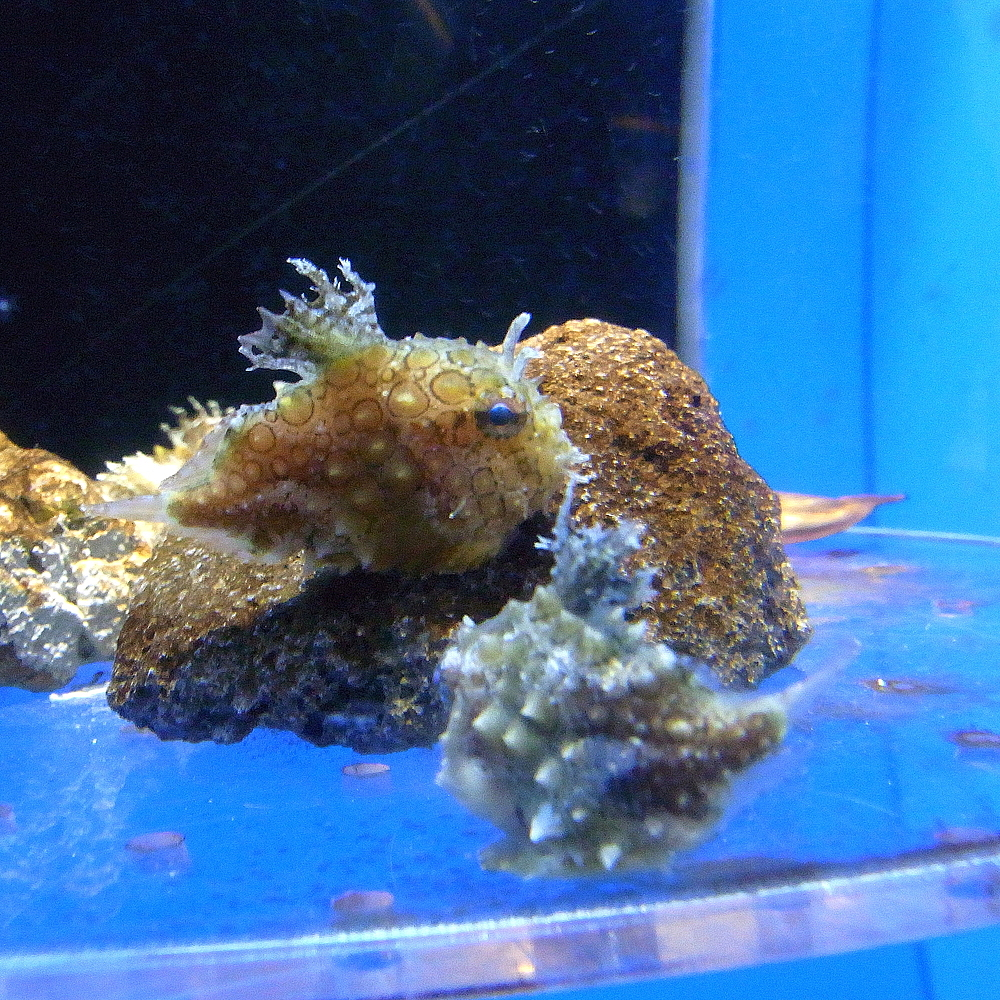

Scientific classification
- Domain: Eukaryota
- Kingdom: Animalia
- Phylum: Chordata
- Class: Actinopterygii
- Order: Perciformes
- Suborder: Cottoidei
- Family: Cyclopteridae
- Genus: Eumicrotremus
- Species: E. taranetzi

Binomial name
- Eumicrotremus taranetzi Perminov, 1936

Synonyms
- Eumicrotremus orbis taranetzi Perminov, 1936

= Eumicrotremus taranetzi =

Species of lumpfish

Eumicrotremus taranetzi is a species of lumpfish native to the Northwest Pacific. It is known from the Bering Sea, the Kuril Islands, the Sea of Okhotsk, and the Sea of Japan. It is a small demersal fish that reaches 5.9 cm (2.3 in) SL.
