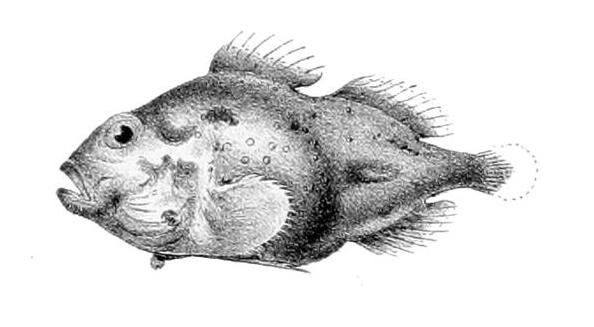

Scientific classification
- Kingdom: Animalia
- Phylum: Chordata
- Class: Actinopterygii
- Order: Perciformes
- Suborder: Cottoidei
- Family: Cyclopteridae
- Genus: Eumicrotremus
- Species: E. gyrinops

Binomial name
- Eumicrotremus gyrinops Garman, 1892

= Eumicrotremus gyrinops =

Species of lumpfish

Eumicrotremus gyrinops, known as the Alaskan lumpsucker, is a species of lumpfish native to the Bering Sea and the Aleutian Islands. It is a small demersal fish that occurs at a depth range of 70 to 172 metres (230 to 564 ft) and reaches 5.2 centimetres (2.0 in) SL.
