= Eumicrotremus fedorovi =

Scientific classification
- Kingdom: Animalia
- Phylum: Chordata
- Class: Actinopterygii
- Order: Perciformes
- Suborder: Cottoidei
- Family: Cyclopteridae
- Genus: Eumicrotremus
- Species: E. fedorovi

Binomial name
- Eumicrotremus fedorovi Mandritsa, 1991

Synonyms
- Microancathus fedorovi (Mandrytsa 1991)

Species of fish

Eumicrotremus fedorovi is a species of marine ray-finned fish belonging to the family Cyclopteridae, the lumpfishes or lumpsuckers. This species is found in the northwestern Pacific Ocean around the Kuril Islands. It is a demersal fish that occurs at a depth range of 115 to 370 m (377 to 1,214 ft). This species was first formally described in 1991 by Sergey Anatolyevich Mandritsa with its type locality given as the Rikord Strait. The specific name honours the Russian zoologist Vladimir Vladimirovich Fedorov who studied the holotype and suggested that it represented a new species.
