= David Henry Solomon =

Australian polymer chemist

David Solomon AC FRS FAA FTSE
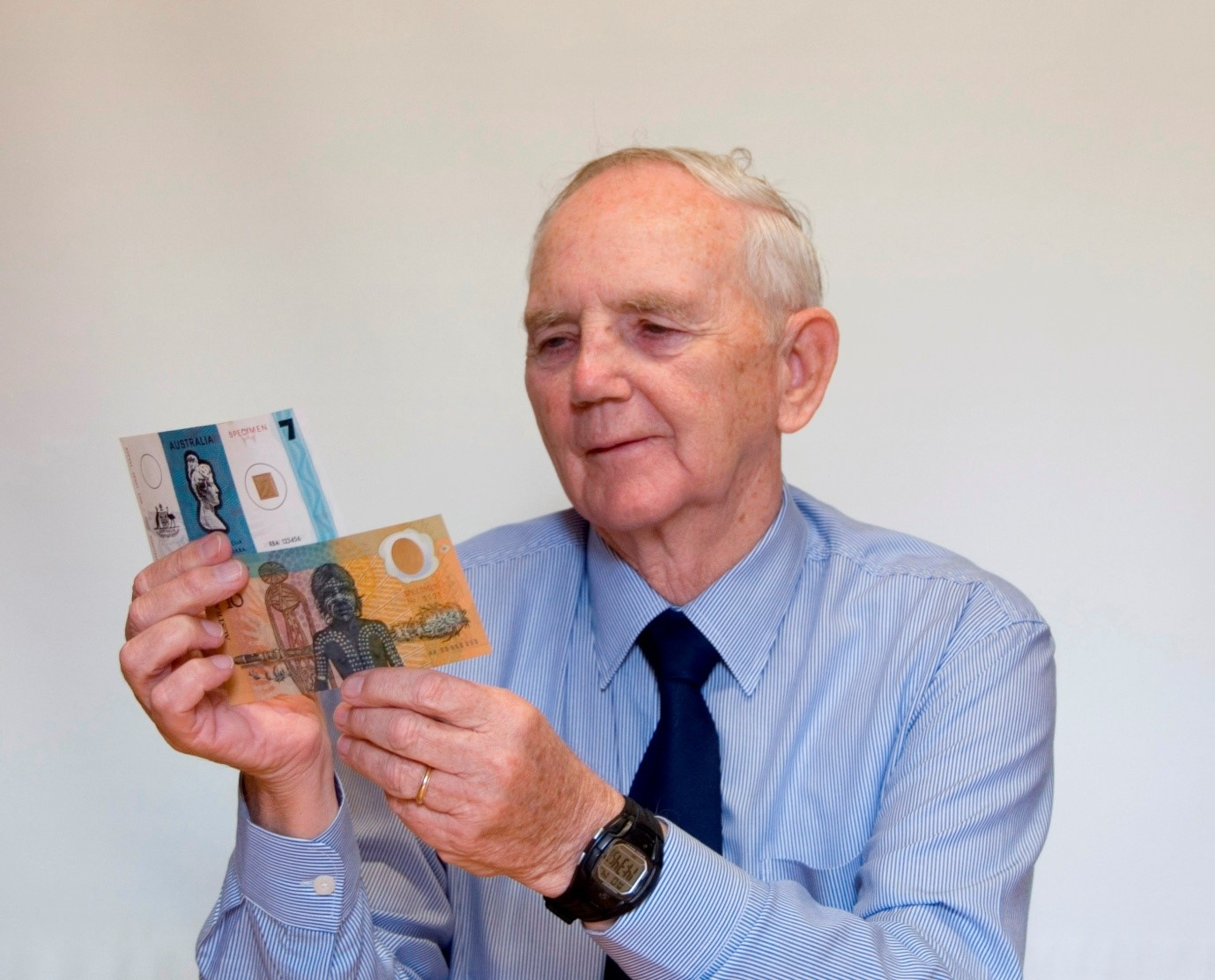
- Solomon holding specimen polymer banknotes
- Born: David Henry Solomon; 18 November 1929 (age 96); Adelaide, South Australia, Australia
- Education: Sydney Technical College; University of New South Wales; University of Melbourne
- Known for: Development of Living Radical Polymerization techniques, and polymer banknotes
- Awards: Companion of the Order of Australia (2016); Fellow of the Royal Society (2004); Member of the Order of Australia (1990); Foundation Fellow of the Australian Academy of Science (1976); Fellow of the Australian Academy of Science (1975)
- Scientific career
- Fields: Polymer chemistry
- Workplaces: CSIRO; University of Melbourne
- Theses: Studies on the Chemistry of Carbonyl Compounds (1959); Studies on the Chemistry of Coating Compounds (1968)

David Henry Solomon AC (born 19 November 1929) is an Australian polymer chemist. He is best known for his work in developing Living Radical Polymerization techniques, and polymer banknotes.

== Education ==
David Henry Solomon was born 19 November 1929 in Adelaide, South Australia. He received an Associate of Sydney Technical College, (equivalent to a Diploma of Chemistry) in 1950 and went on to complete a Bachelor of Science (BSc (Hons)) in 1952 from the New South Wales University of Technology (now the University of New South Wales), a Master of Science (MSc) from the same university in 1955, and a PhD from the University of New South Wales in 1959 with a thesis entitled Studies on the Chemistry of Carbonyl Compounds. In 1968 he was awarded a DSc from the University of New South Wales for his thesis Studies on the Chemistry of Coating Compounds. He also received an Honorary Doctorate in Applied Science from the University of Melbourne in 2005, one of only seven awarded in the university's history.

== Career ==
Solomon joined British Australian Lead Manufacturers Pty Ltd (BALM, which later became Dulux Australia Ltd) as a trainee chemist in 1946 at the age of 16. It was here that he developed his lifelong interest in polymers, and made important observations that the current theories on polymers did not match with what was actually happening in the industrial processes.

Solomon's strong interest in polymer research drew him to join CSIRO as a senior research scientist in the Division of Applied Mineralogy in 1963. In 1970 Solomon transferred to the Division of Applied Chemistry where he established the Polymer Research Group, before going on to become chief of the Division of Applied Organic Chemistry during a reorganisation in 1974, a position he held for the next 17 years.

In 1990 he accepted an invitation to become the ICI Australia – Masson Professor and head of the School of Chemistry at the University of Melbourne. Here he started the Polymer Science Group, his third internationally acclaimed polymer research group. After ‘retirement’ in 1995 David took up the position of honorary professorial fellow in the Department of Chemical and Biomolecular Engineering at the university, moving the Polymer Science Group, to which he still acts as senior advisor. In 2015 he was awarded the title of professor emeritus at the University of Melbourne.

Solomon is often referred to as the father of polymer research in Australia, having established three internationally acclaimed polymer research groups in industry (Dulux, 1960), in Australia's peak scientific research organisation, CSIRO (1970) and at the University of Melbourne (1990).

== Research achievements ==
Solomon is well known for several of his research achievements. In particular his work on free radical polymerization revolutionized the field through the development of the first living free-radical polymerization technique; Nitroxide Mediated Polymerization (NMP). He also led the team, and was principal inventor of the world's first polymer banknote.

=== Free Radical Polymerization ===
Solomon's ground-breaking work on free radical polymerization was initiated through observations made in industry. For example, anomalies that were not explained by polymerization theory at the time, and the observation that during the production of polymer/mineral composites some batches underwent spontaneous combustion. This led to discoveries that had significant influence on the future directions of radical chemistry. It led to the development of Nitroxide Mediated Polymerization (NMP), the first example of a controlled, or living, radical polymerization technique. This research also produced early examples of what was to become known as RAFT, or Reversible addition−fragmentation chain-transfer polymerization. Solomon's work rewrote the theory on free radical polymerization, and he was co-author with Graeme Moad on the definitive reference book: The Chemistry of Radical Polymerization (Moad & Solomon, 2006). Previous theories attempted to explain radical polymerization on the basis of thermodynamic stability controlling structure. Solomon's work showed that kinetics was the major factor in controlling the way polymer chains formed.

=== Polymer banknotes ===
Following a major forgery of Australia's newly introduced $10 notes in 1967, Solomon was invited to a meeting about how to make more secure bank notes. Given his background in polymer science Solomon's idea was to print the notes on a plastic substrate rather than the traditional paper, and incorporate optically variable devices – defined as a device that changes its appearance when something external is done to the note.

Solomon went on to lead the research team and was the principal inventor of the world's first polymer banknote, with the first note issued into circulation in 1988: the Australian bicentennial $10. He has chronicled the history of the development of polymer banknotes in The Plastic Banknote: From Concept to Reality, co-authored with Tom Spurling (published in 2014).

== Selected honours ==
Solomon has been the recipient of numerous prestigious awards throughout his career. A selected list is outlined below.

- 2016 Companion of the Order of Australia.
- 2011 Prime Minister's Prize for Science, awarded jointly with Dr Ezio Rizzardo.
- 2006 Victoria Prize.
- 2001 Centenary Medal.
- 1994 Clunies Ross National Science and Technology Award.
- 1990 Member of the Order of Australia.
- 1989 Ian William Wark Medal and Lecture.

== Professional societies ==
Solomon's considerable contributions to science have been recognised by his peers through election to the following Academies:

- Fellow of the Institution of Chemical Engineers (FIChemE, 2007)
- Fellow of the Royal Society (FRS, 2004).
- Foundation Fellow of the Australian Academy of Technological Sciences and Engineering (FTSE, 1976).
- Fellow of the Australian Academy of Science (FAA, 1975).
- Fellow of the Royal Australian Chemical Institute (FRACI, 1966)

Solomon has always been active in these societies, in particular the Royal Australian Chemical Institute (RACI). In 2001 the RACI established the Solomon Lecture Series in recognition of his contribution to the field and to the RACI. A biennial series presented by an invited leading international polymer researcher, this Lecture Series recognizes the importance of promoting the exchange of ideas and expertise and to expose young scientists to the best in their field internationally.

== Publications ==
Solomon is co-author of nine books, including an historical account of the development of plastic banknotes (The Plastic Banknote: From Concept to Reality) and several text books (including The Chemistry of Radical Polymerization). He is also co-author of over 250 journal papers and 45 patents.
