= Eumicrotremus terraenovae =

Scientific classification
- Kingdom: Animalia
- Phylum: Chordata
- Class: Actinopterygii
- Division: Teleostei
- Order: Perciformes
- Suborder: Cottoidei
- Family: Cyclopteridae
- Genus: Eumicrotremus
- Species: E. terraenovae

Binomial name
- Eumicrotremus terraenovae Myers & Böhlke, 1950

Species of fish

Eumicrotremus terraenovae, also known as the Newfoundland spiny lumpsucker, is a species of lumpfish native to the Northwest Atlantic. It is a demersal fish found off of Newfoundland and in the Gulf of Maine.
