= San Thang =

Professor San Thang AC FTSE FRACI FAA
- Born: 28 August 1954 (age 72); Saigon, Vietnam
- Citizenship: Australian
- Education: Griffith University
- Scientific career
- Fields: Polymer chemistry
- Workplaces: CSIRO; Monash University

Thang Hoa San (Vietnamese: Thang Hoa Sân, Chinese: 湯華燊; born 28 August 1954) is an Australian chemist of Chinese-Vietnamese background.

== Background ==
Thang was born in Saigon in 1954 to Chinese parents who migrated to Vietnam in the 1930s. He completed his Bachelor of Science at Saigon University in 1976, and worked as a chemist at SINCO, a sewing machine manufacturer. In 1979, Thang left Vietnam as a refugee from the Vietnam War, and spent five months in a refugee camp in Malaysia before arriving in Brisbane, Australia later in the year. He enrolled at Griffith University where he completed an Honours degree in chemistry and a PhD in organic chemistry.

In 1986, Thang joined the CSIRO, the Australian government's scientific agency. In 1987, he left to join ICI Australia, but returned to CSIRO in 1990. In September 2014, research by Thomson Reuters for their citation laureate prize named Thang as one of a trio of CSIRO scientists (together with Ezio Rizzardo and Graeme Moad) most likely to be contenders for the Nobel Prize in Chemistry for their work in co-developing the reversible addition−fragmentation chain-transfer polymerization (RAFT) process. The three had shared the ATSE Clunies-Ross Award earlier that year. However, in December that year, Thang revealed that he had been laid off by the organisation in September, but had continued to work there unpaid in an honorary position. He later worked as a professor for Beijing University of Chemical Technology, and in May 2015, joined Monash University as a professor of chemistry and was elected as a Fellow of the Australian Academy of Science.
