= Kazunari Dōmen =

Japanese chemist

- 堂免一成
- Born: 24 September 1953 (age 73)
- Education: University of Tokyo
- Scientific career
- Thesis: Photocatalytic Reaction on Some Semiconductor Powders
- Website: https://www.shinshu-u.ac.jp/institution/rism/domen-hisatomi-lab/en/

Kazunari Dōmen (born September 24, 1953) is a Japanese chemist and materials scientist specializing in heterogeneous catalysis, photocatalysis, and solar-driven water splitting. He is a University Professor in the Office of University Professors at the University of Tokyo and a Distinguished University Professor at the Institute for Aqua Regeneration, Shinshu University.

== Early life and education ==
Domen was born in 1953 in Japan. He studied at the University of Tokyo, receiving a bachelor's degree in 1976, a master's degree from its School of Science in 1979, and a Ph.D. in chemistry in 1982 with his thesis Photocatalytic Reaction on Some Semiconductor Powders.

After completing his doctorate, Domen joined the Chemical Resources Laboratory at Tokyo Institute of Technology as an assistant professor in 1982. He subsequently became an associate professor in 1990 and professor in 1996. During this period, he spent time as a visiting scientist at the IBM Almaden Research Center in California.

== Career ==
In 2004, Domen was appointed assistant professor at the Tokyo Institute of Technology. He stayed as a postdoctoral fellow at the IBM Almaden Research Center in San José, California in 1985/86. He was promoted to associate professor at the Tokyo Institute of Technology in 1990 and received a full professorship in 1996. Dōmen returned to his alma mater in 2004 as a professor. Together with Takashi Hisatomi, he has also been running a research laboratory at Shinshū University since 2017.

He began a cross-appointment with Shinshu University in 2017 and subsequently held positions at the university's Center for Energy & Environmental Science and Research Initiative for Supra-Materials. He became a Distinguished University Professor at Shinshu University's Institute for Aqua Regeneration in 2025.

Domen has also been involved in the organization of scientific conferences. In 2018, he served as chairperson of TOCAT8, the eighth Tokyo Conference on Advanced Catalytic Science and Technology, held in Yokohama.

He has served as a reviewer for journals including Nature Materials, Nature Catalysis, Nature Energy, Nature Communications, Energy & Environmental Science, Chemical Science, Joule, Journal of the American Chemical Society, Angewandte Chemie International Edition, and ACS Catalysis.

== Research ==
Domen and his collaborators developed particulate photocatalytic systems intended to make solar hydrogen production scalable. In 2016, his group reported particulate photocatalyst sheets capable of producing hydrogen and oxygen with a solar-to-hydrogen energy conversion efficiency exceeding 1 percent. Subsequent research addressed the durability and efficiency of photocatalysts and the design of reaction systems for large-scale deployment.

His group also developed a 100-square-meter solar hydrogen production system using particulate photocatalysts. The work demonstrated the possibility of scaling photocatalytic water splitting beyond laboratory-scale experiments and became an important component of Domen's research into practical solar hydrogen production.

In more recent research, Domen has focused on the materials and systems required for large-scale solar hydrogen production, including photocatalysts with higher solar-to-hydrogen conversion efficiencies, improved durability, reactor design, and gas separation. A 2025 review in Nature Reviews Materials examined materials and systems for large-scale photocatalytic water splitting, including work associated with Domen's research group.

In 2025, Domen published a major review on particulate photocatalysts for large-scale green hydrogen production. The article examined semiconductor photocatalysts, cocatalysts, particulate systems, visible-light response, panel reactors, and hydrogen and oxygen separation. He was a co-author of a Nature paper published in August 2026 reporting photocatalytic water splitting using a two-dimensional polymer with out-of-plane carrier flow.

== Awards and honors ==
- 1990 – Encouragement Prize, Catalysis Society of Japan.
- 1991 – Catalyst Preparation Chemistry Award, Catalysis Society of Japan.
- 2007 – Catalysis Society of Japan Award.
- 2011 – Chemical Society of Japan Award.
- 2014 – Lewis Lecturer, University of Cambridge.
- 2018 – Japan Petroleum Institute Award.
- 2018 – Japanese Photochemistry Association Lectureship Award.
- 2019 – Lee Hsun Lecture Award, Institute of Metal Research, Chinese Academy of Sciences.
- 2019 – Advance of Catalysis Award, Asia-Pacific Association of Catalysis Societies (APACS).
- 2020 – Honorary Fellow, Chinese Chemical Society.
- 2022 – Contribution Award, Japan Society of Coordination Chemistry.
- 2022 – Fellow of the Royal Society of Chemistry.
- 2022 – EIC Horizon Prize, "Fuel from the Sun: Artificial Photosynthesis." The prize recognized a research team that developed an artificial-photosynthesis system for producing usable fuel from sunlight, water and carbon dioxide.
- 2024 – Heinz Heinemann Award, International Association of Catalysis Societies, for contributions to photocatalytic water splitting, solar hydrogen production, and large-scale green hydrogen production.
- 2024 – Clarivate Citation Laureate (2024), for "fundamental research on photocatalysts for water splitting and the construction of solar hydrogen production systems".
- 2025 – August Wilhelm von Hofmann Lecture, German Chemical Society, for contributions to photocatalytic water splitting and solar-powered hydrogen production.
- 2025 – Nanqiang Lecture, Xiamen University.
- 2026 – Fred Kavli Distinguished Lectureship in Materials Science, Materials Research Society. Domen delivered the plenary lecture "Photocatalytic Water Splitting to Produce Solar Hydrogen and Fuels" at the 2026 MRS Spring Meeting.

== Selected publications ==
- K. Domen, S. Naito, M. Soma, T. Onishi and K. Tamaru, “Photocatalytic decomposition of water vapour on an NiO-SrTiO3 catalyst” J. Chem. Soc. Chem. Commun., 1980, 12, 543-544.
- K. Maeda, K. Teramura, D. Lu, T. Takata, N. Saito, Y. Inoue, K. Domen, “Photocatalyst releasing hydrogen from water - Enhancing catalytic performance holds promise for hydrogen production by water splitting in sunlight” Nature, 2006, 440, 295.
- XC. Wang, K. Maeda, A. Thomas, K. Takanabe, G. Xin, JM. Carlsson, K. Domen, M. Antonietti, “A metal-free polymeric photocatalyst for hydrogen production from water under visible light” Nature Materials, 2009, 8(1), 76-80.
- C. Pan, T. Takata, M. Nakabayashi, T. Matsumoto, N. Shibata, Y. Ikuhara, K. Domen “A Complex Perovskite-Type Oxynitride: The First Photocatalyst for Water Splitting Operable at up to 600 nm” Angew. Chem. Int. Ed., 2015, 54, 2955-2959.
- Q. Wang, T. Hisatomi, Q. Jia, H. Tokudome, M. Zhong, C. Wang, Z. Pan, T. Takata, M. Nakabayashi, N. Shibata, Y. Li, I. D. Sharp, A. Kudo, T. Yamada, K. Domen “Scalable water splitting on particulate photocatalyst sheets with a solar-to-hydrogen energy conversion efficiency exceeding 1%” Nature, Mater., 2016, 15, 611-615.
- Z. Wang, Y. Inoue, T. Hisatomi, R. Ishikawa, Q. Wang, T. Takata, S. Chen, N. Shibata, Y. Ikuhara, K. Domen “Overall water splitting by Ta3N5 nanorod single crystals grown on the edges of KaTaO3 particles” Nature Catal., 2018, 1, 756-763.
- Q. Wang, M. Nakabayashi, T. Hisatomi, S. Sun, S. Akiyama, Z. Wang, Z. Pan, X. Xiao, T. Watanabe, T. Yamada, N. Shibata, T. Takata, K. Domen "Oxysulfide photocatalyst for visible-light-driven overall water splitting" Nature Mater., 2019, 18, 827-832.
- T. Takata, J. Jiang, Y. Sakata, M. Nakabayashi, N. Shibata, V. Nandal, K. Seki, T. Hisatomi, K. Domen, “Photocatalytic water splitting with a quantum efficiency of almost unity”, Nature, 2020, 581, 411-414.
- H. Nishiyama, T. Yamada, M. Nakabayashi, Y. Maehara, M. Yamaguchi, Y. Kuromiya, Y. Nagatsuma, H. Tokudome, S. Akiyama, T. Watanabe, R. Narushima, S. Okunaka, N. Shibata, T. Takata, T. Hisatomi, K. Domen, “Photocatalytic solar hydrogen production from water on 100 m2-scale” , Nature, 2021, 598, 304-307.
- H. ZhuZhang, ZY. Yu, XC. Liang, LH. Lin, XZ. Fu, K. Domen, XC. Wang, “Photocatalytic water splitting by 2D polymer with out-of-plane carrier flow”, Nature, 2026, 656, 624-629.
