= Eumicrotremus andriashevi =

Scientific classification
- Domain: Eukaryota
- Kingdom: Animalia
- Phylum: Chordata
- Class: Actinopterygii
- Order: Perciformes
- Suborder: Cottoidei
- Family: Cyclopteridae
- Genus: Eumicrotremus
- Species: E. andriashevi

Binomial name
- Eumicrotremus andriashevi Perminov, 1936

Species of fish

Eumicrotremus andriashevi, also known as the pimpled lumpsucker, is a species of lumpfish native to the Arctic and North Pacific. In addition to the Arctic Ocean, it may be found in the Chukchi and Bering Seas, where it occurs at a depth range of 20 to 83 m (66 to 272 ft). It is a small bottom-dwelling fish that reaches 4.8 cm (1.9 inches) in standard length.

Two subspecies of this fish are recognized:

- E. a. aculeatus Voskoboinikova & Nazarkin, 2015
- E. a. andriashevi Perminov, 1936

E. a. aculeatus can be distinguished from the nominate subspecies by its taller body, shorter snout, and larger bone plaques that form the fish's "cheeks". Eumicrotremus andriashevi is the only species in the family Cyclopteridae to have any recognized subspecies.

== Etymology ==
The fish is named in honor of Soviet ichthyologist Anatoly Petrovich Andriashev (1910-2009), who was studying the fishes of the northern Pacific Ocean, and provided the author with helpful recommendations.
