= Leonid Shulpin =

Russian ornithologist (1905–1942)

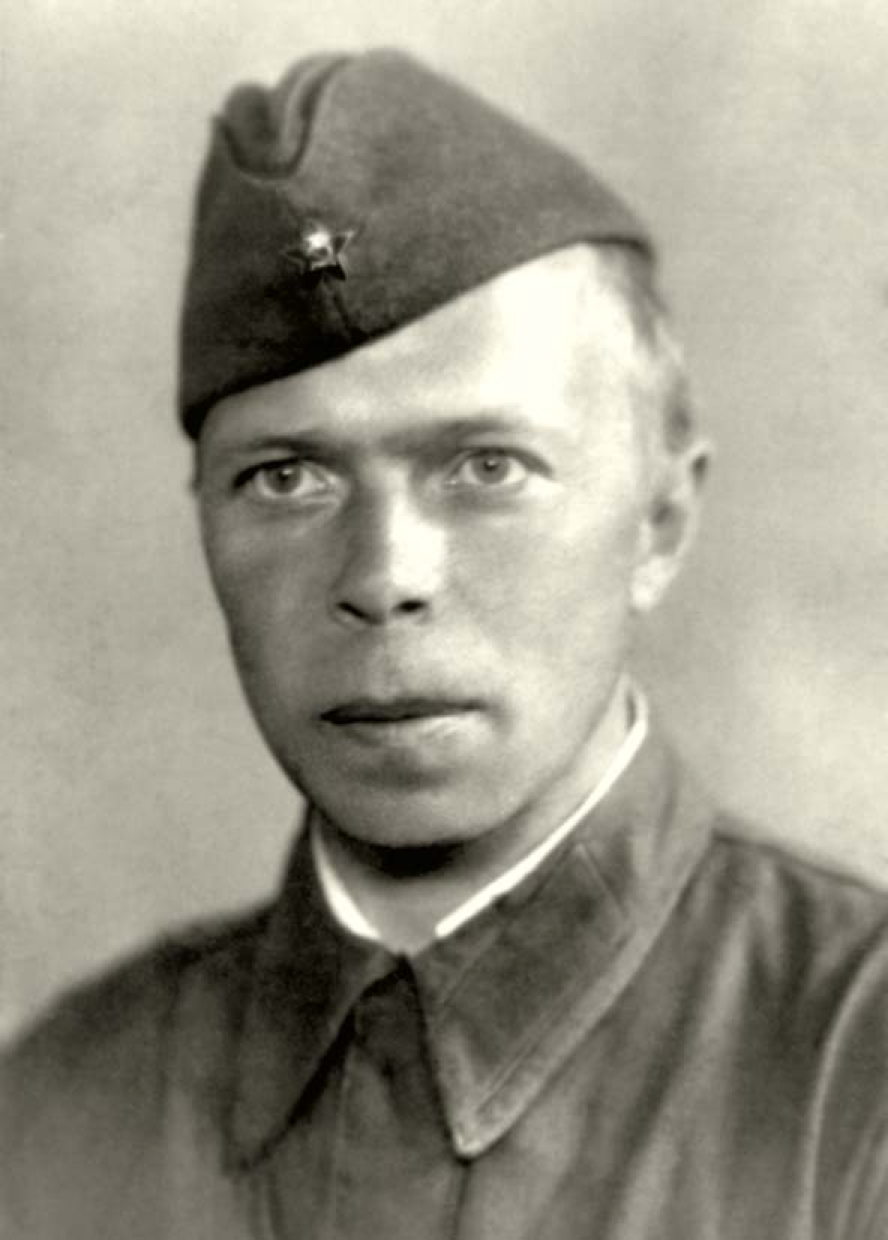
Shulpin in army uniform

Leonid Mikhailovich Shulpin (Russian: Леонид Михайлович Шульпин; June 5, 1905 – March 20, 1942) was a Russian and Soviet ornithologist who worked in the Siberian and Russian far east regions. He published one of the first Russian textbooks in Ornithology in 1940. He was killed during World War II.

== Biography ==
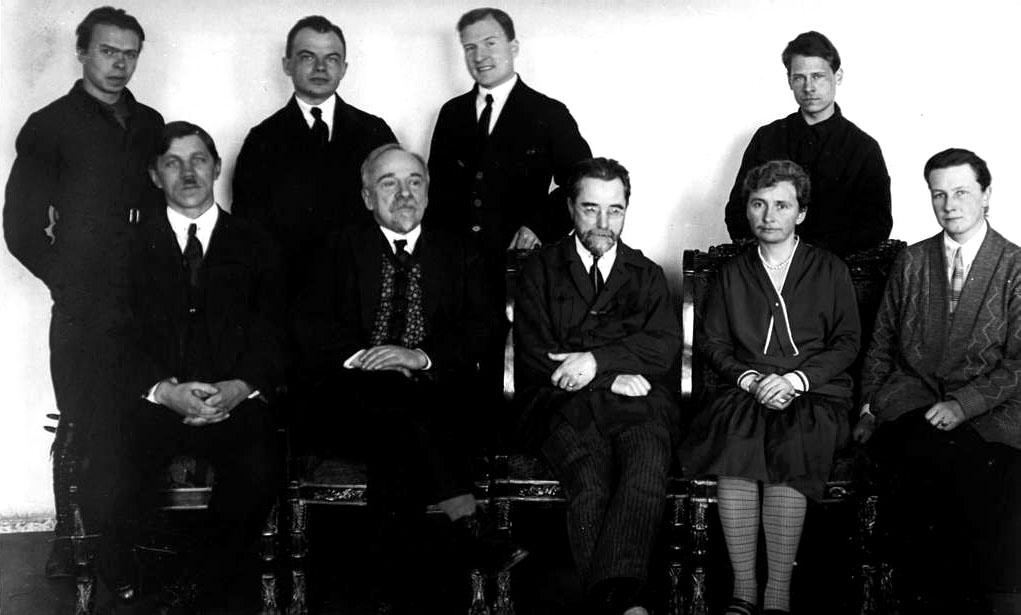
Shulpin (standing leftmost) with other Soviet ornithologists, 1924

Shulpin was born in Moscow, where his father Mikhail Ivanovich, originally from Karsun, worked as an accountant. His mother died when he was just five. He went to study at the local elementary school and then to the gymnasium. In 1918 the family (his father remarried) left Moscow to Karsun and he studied there until 1922, when his family returned to Moscow. Here he began to take an interest in the birds and went to the biological station in Sokolniki. In 1924 he joined Leningrad State University where he was supervised by K. M. Deryugin. In 1925-26 he worked as an intern at the Peterhof Natural Science Institute working with artificial nests, and ringing birds. In 1926 he joined expeditions into the south Ussuri region and the Primorye in the next two year. He collected 2605 bird skins. In 1929 he defended his degree with a dissertation on the avifauna of the Primorye. He then joined the Academy of Sciences of the USSR and began to work under Petr Sushkin from 1929. He made expeditions into the Altai again. In 1934 he became an associate professor and in 1938 he became a doctoral candidate. His students included A.S. Malchevsky and N.N. Danilov. In 1941 he enrolled in the army as a paramedic in an artillery regiment. While serving with the 218th Infantry Regiment he was hit by a shell fragment and died during surgery. He was buried in a nearby village in Pogostye but later reburied at the New Maluksa memorial in Leningrad.

Subspecies named in his honour include Coccothraustes coccothraustes schulpini named by H. Johansen in 1944 and Penthestes montanus shulpini (now a synonym) by Portenko in 1955.
