= Far Eastern Branch of the Russian Academy of Sciences =

Academic institution established in 1987

The Far Eastern Branch of the Russian Academy of Sciences (Russian:Дальневосточное отделение Российской академии наук)( abbr. FEB RAS) is a regional branch of the Russian Academy of Sciences, which is a geographically distributed system of research centers, institutes, stations and reserves covering almost the entire territory of the Far Eastern Federal District. The research centers of the FEB RAS are located in Vladivostok, Khabarovsk, Petropavlovsk-Kamchatsky, Magadan, Blagoveshchensk and Yuzhno-Sakhalinsk. Separate institutes operate in Birobidzhan and Anadyr. At the beginning of 2017, about 7,500 people worked in the Far Eastern Branch, among them 2,500 researchers, including 23 academicians and 141 corresponding members of the Russian Academy of Sciences.
