= Konstantin Deryugin =

Russian zoologist (1878–1938)

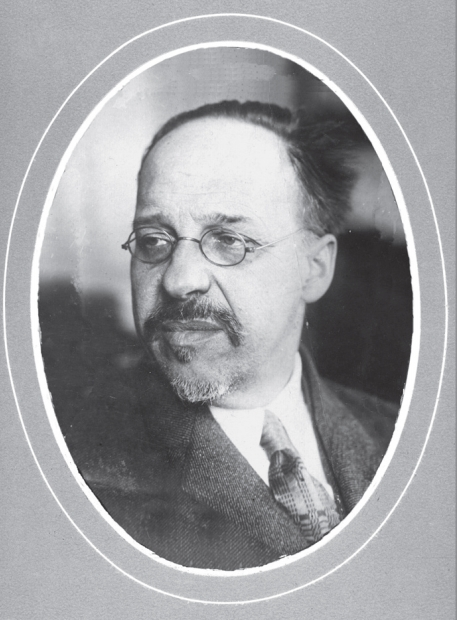
Deryugin in 1925

Konstantin Mikhailovich Deryugin (Russian: Константин Михайлович Дерюгин: 10 February 1878 – 27 December 1938) was Russian Empire and Soviet oceanographer and marine biologist. He served as a professor of hydrology at St. Petersburg University and took part in a number of oceanographic expeditions. Mount Deryugin and the Deryugin basin in the Sea of Okhotsk are named after him.

Deryugin was born in St. Petersburg where his father was a lawyer. He studied at the Pskov gymnasium and even as a young student he was interested in bird life. He published his first papers on the birds of Pskov Bay shortly after joining the university and studied under V.M. Shimkevich, graduating in the natural sciences in 1900. A year before his graduation, he took part in an expedition to the White Sea which made him interested in marine life and oceanography. He received a master's degree in 1909 and a doctorate in 1915 with study on the fauna of Kola Bay. He became a lecturer at St Petersburg University in 1917 and became a professor in 1919 while also working at the State Hydrological Institute. He took an interest in marine life and worked on a number of taxa, collecting and examining their distributions. He noted the effect of the warm currents and their effect on marine life. He identified faunal barriers formed by warm shallow waters in the Gorlo Strait. His students included the ornithologist Leonid Shulpin.
