= Elena V. Shevchenko =

Belarusian-American nanoscientist

Elena V. Shevchenko is a Belarusian and American nanoscientist whose research involves the synthesis of nanoparticles with controlled sizes and shapes, the design of nanoparticles with complex structures, and their self-assembly into nanoscale materials, as well as the synthesis of nanoscale superlattices and colloidal nanocrystals. She is a part-time professor of chemistry at the University of Chicago, and a scientist at the Argonne National Laboratory.

== Education and career ==
Shevchenko graduated from the Belarusian State University in Minsk in 1998. She continued her education at the University of Hamburg in Germany, where she completed her Ph.D. in 2003.

Next, she became a postdoctoral researcher with a joint position at Columbia University and for IBM at the Thomas J. Watson Research Center. She became a staff scientist at the Lawrence Berkeley National Laboratory in 2005, and moved to the Argonne National Laboratory in 2007. She added an affiliation as a part-time professor at the University of Chicago in 2021.

== Recognition ==
Shevchenko was one of the 2009 recipients of the Presidential Early Career Award for Scientists and Engineers.
