= Rikord Strait =

Strait in the Kuril Islands

Coordinates: 47°25′N 152°39′E

Rikord Strait (Russian: Proliv Rikorda; Japanese: Ketoi Kaikyo) is a strait that separates the islands of Ushishir and Ketoy in the Kuril Islands, Russia. It is 22.5 km (about 14 mi) wide. An extensive bank at its center causes whirlpools and eddies.
