= Nano Today =

- Discipline: Nano science and technology
- Language: English
- Edited by: Professor Yuliang Zhao, National Center for Nanosciences and Technology, China

Publication details
- History: 2006-present
- Publisher: Elsevier (UK)
- Frequency: bimonthly
- Impact factor: 18.962 (2021)

Standard abbreviations
- ISO 4: Nano Today

Indexing
- ISSN: 1748-0132

Links
- Journal homepage

Nano Today is dedicated to publishing work across nanoscience and technology. The journal considers any article that informs readers of the latest research and advances in the field, research breakthroughs, and topical issues which express views on developments in related fields. Through its mixture of peer-reviewed articles, the latest research news, and information on key developments, Nano Today provides comprehensive coverage of the field. Established in 2006, it is published six times a year by Elsevier.
