= John M. Jumper =

American chemist and computer scientist (born 1985)

John Jumper
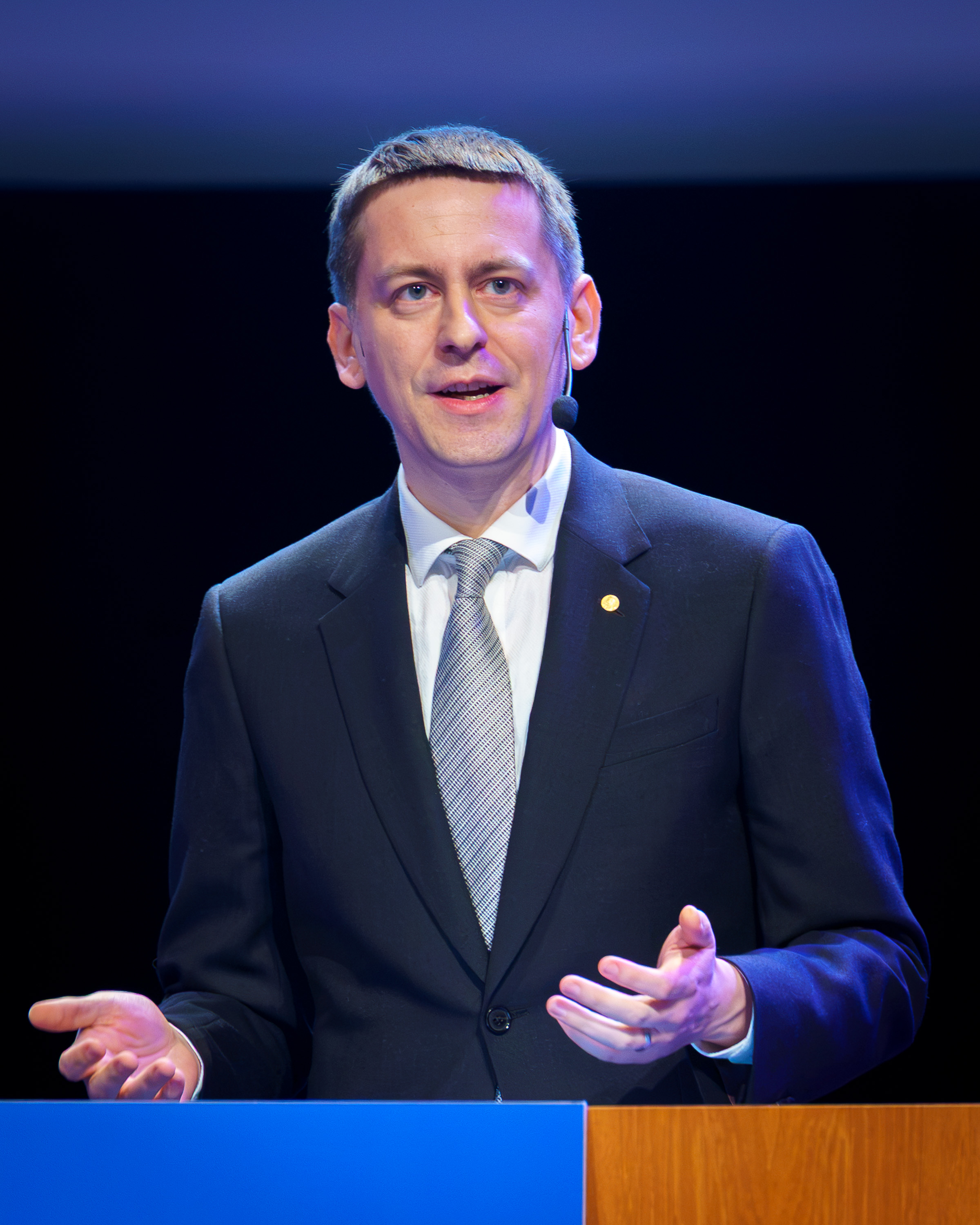
- John Jumper presenting his Nobel Lecture at the 2024 Nobel Prizes
- Born: John Michael Jumper; 1 January 1985 (age 41); Little Rock, Arkansas, U.S.
- Education: Vanderbilt University (BS); University of Cambridge (MPhil); University of Chicago (MS, PhD)
- Known for: AlphaFold
- Awards: Marshall Scholarship (2007); Nature's 10 (2021); BBVA Foundation Frontiers of Knowledge Award (2022); Breakthrough Prize in Life Sciences (2023); Nobel Prize in Chemistry (2024)
- Scientific career
- Fields: Artificial intelligence Machine learning
- Workplaces: Google DeepMind
- Thesis: New Methods Using Rigorous Machine Learning for Coarse-Grained Protein Folding and Dynamics (2017)
- Doctoral advisor: Tobin R. Sosnick; Karl Freed

John Michael Jumper (born 1 January 1985) is an American chemist and computer scientist. Jumper and Demis Hassabis were awarded the 2024 Nobel Prize in Chemistry for protein structure prediction along with David Baker for computational protein design.

Jumper served as a director at Google DeepMind for nearly nine years. Jumper and his colleagues created AlphaFold, an artificial intelligence (AI) model to predict protein structures from their amino acid sequence with high accuracy. The AlphaFold team had released 214 million protein structures as of January 2024.

The scientific journal Nature included Jumper as one of the ten "people who mattered" in science in their annual listing of Nature's 10 in 2021.

In June 2026, Jumper announced that he would leave the company to join Anthropic after a break.

== Education ==
Jumper graduated from Pulaski Academy in 2003. He received a Bachelor of Science with majors in physics and mathematics from Vanderbilt University in 2007, a Master of Philosophy in theoretical condensed matter physics from the University of Cambridge where he was a student of St Edmund's College, Cambridge in 2008 on a Marshall Scholarship, a Master of Science in theoretical chemistry from the University of Chicago in 2012, and a Doctor of Philosophy in theoretical chemistry from the University of Chicago in 2017. His doctoral advisors at the University of Chicago were Tobin R. Sosnick and Karl Freed.

== Career ==
Jumper's research investigates algorithms for protein structure prediction.

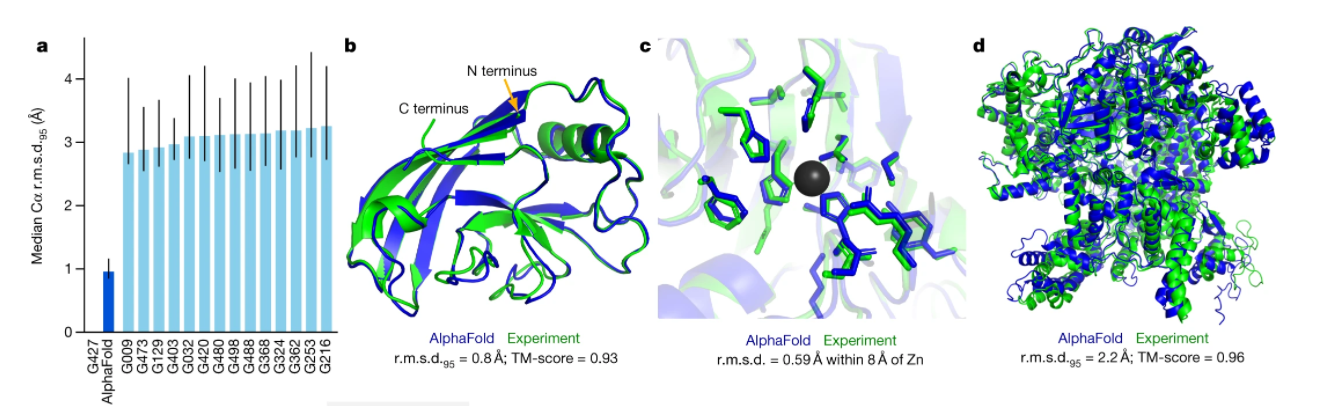
This image represents the final product of AlphaFold and it compares its results with other competitors at the CASP competition.

AlphaFold is a deep learning algorithm developed by Jumper and his team at DeepMind, a research lab acquired by Google's parent company Alphabet Inc. It is an artificial intelligence program which performs predictions of protein structure.

In November 2020, AlphaFold was named the winner of the 14th Critical Assessment of Structure Prediction (CASP) competition. This international competition benchmarks algorithms to determine which one can best predict the 3D structure of proteins. AlphaFold won the competition, outperforming other algorithms scoring above 90 for around two-thirds of the proteins in CASP's global distance test (GDT), a test that measures the degree to which a computational program predicted structure is similar to the lab experiment determined structure, with 100 being a complete match, within the distance cutoff used for calculating GDT.

In 2026, Jumper left DeepMind and joined Anthropic.

== Awards and honors ==
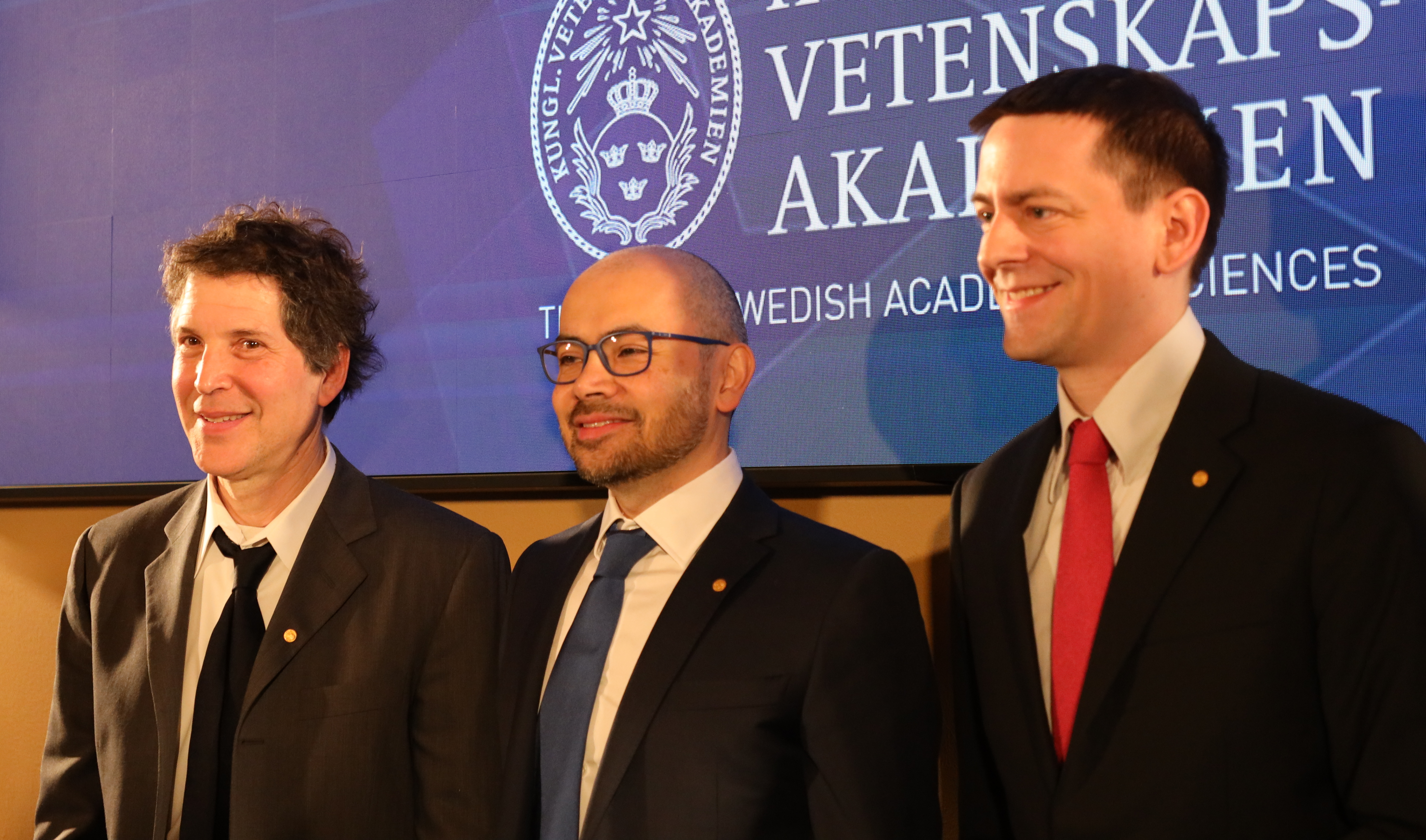
David Baker, Demis Hassabis, and John Jumper at 2024 Nobel Prize Conference

In 2021, Jumper was awarded the BBVA Foundation Frontiers of Knowledge Award in the category "Biology and Biomedicine". In 2022 Jumper received the Wiley Prize in Biomedical Sciences and for 2023 the Breakthrough Prize in Life Sciences for developing AlphaFold, which accurately predicts the structure of a protein. In 2023 he was awarded the Canada Gairdner International Award and the Albert Lasker Award for Basic Medical Research.

In 2024, Jumper and Demis Hassabis shared half of the Nobel Prize in Chemistry for their protein folding predictions, the other half went to David Baker for computational protein design.

In 2025, Jumper received the Golden Plate Award of the American Academy of Achievement and the Marshall Medal of the Marshall Aid Commemoration Commission. He was elected a Fellow of the Royal Society (FRS) that same year. In 2026, he was elected a member of the National Academy of Engineering.
