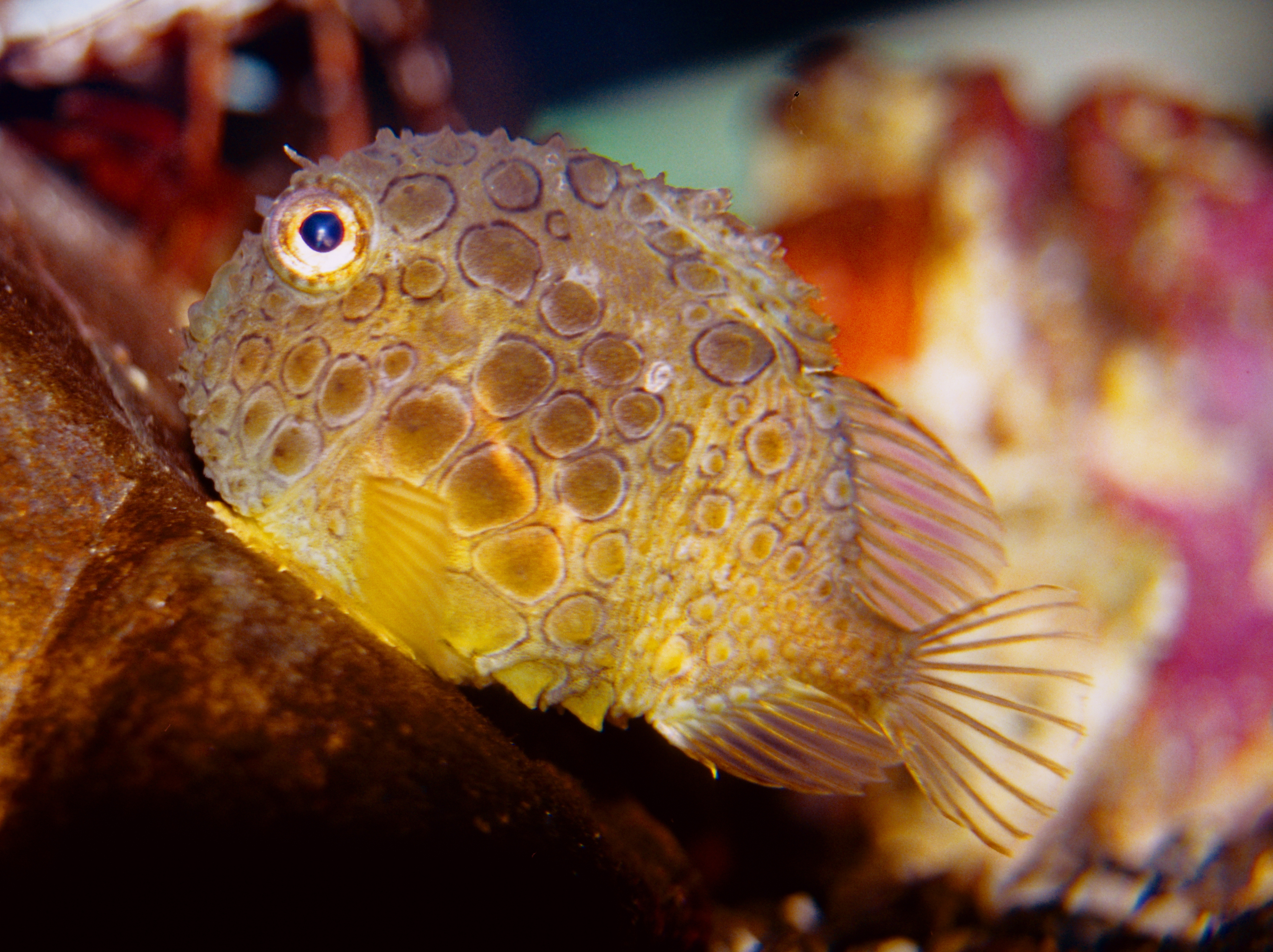

Conservation status
- Least Concern (IUCN 3.1)

Scientific classification
- Kingdom: Animalia
- Phylum: Chordata
- Class: Actinopterygii
- Division: Teleostei
- Order: Perciformes
- Suborder: Cottoidei
- Family: Cyclopteridae
- Genus: Eumicrotremus
- Species: E. orbis

Binomial name
- Eumicrotremus orbis Günther, 1861

Synonyms
- Cyclopterus orbis Günther, 1861; Eumicrotremus orbis orbis (Günther, 1861); Microtremus orbis (Günther, 1861); Lethotremus vinolentus Jordan & Starks, 1895; Eumicrotremus togedango Kuronuma, 1943

= Pacific spiny lumpsucker =

Species of fish

The Pacific spiny lumpsucker (Eumicrotremus orbis) is a species of bony fish in the family Cyclopteridae.

== Description ==
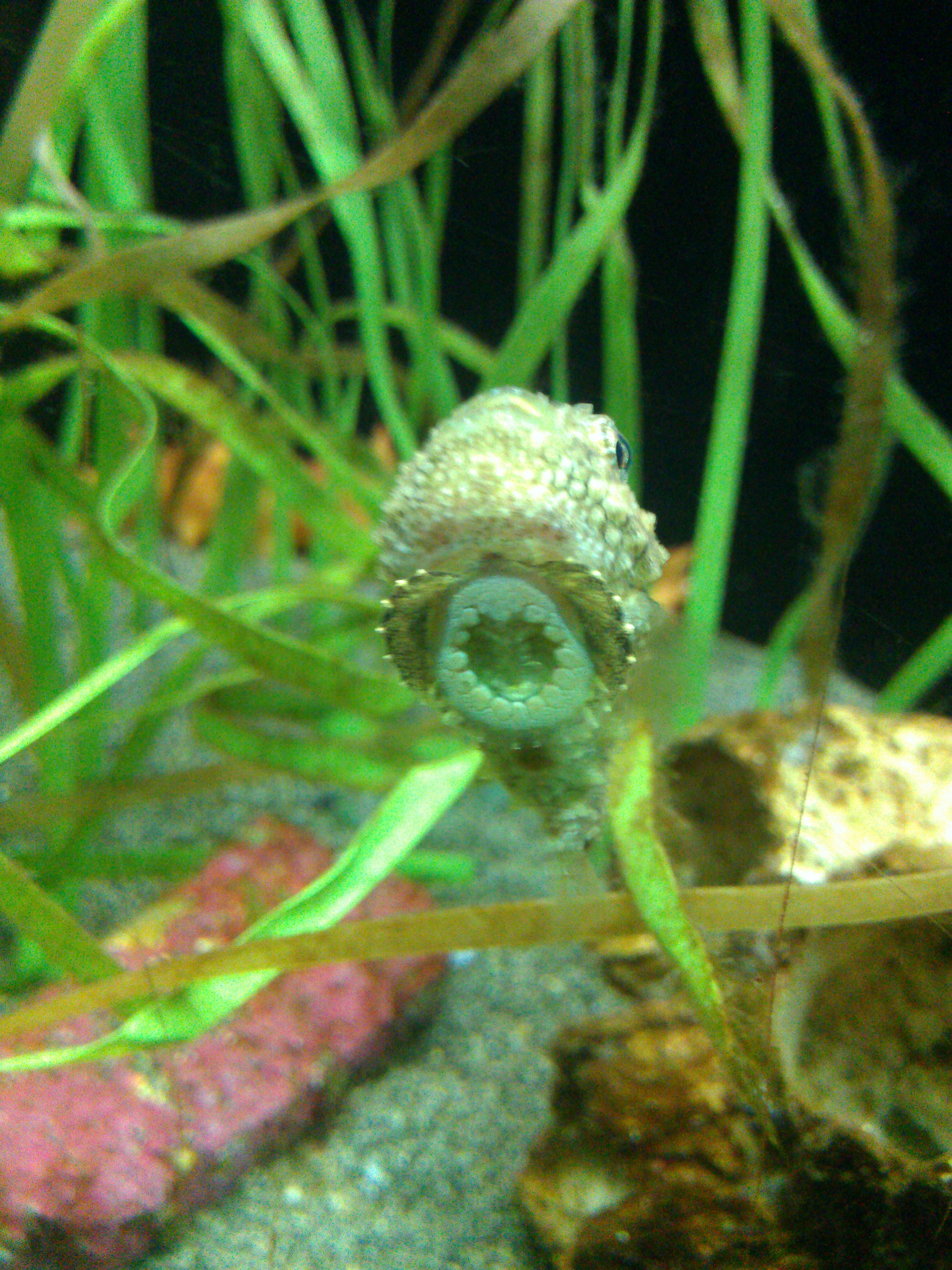
Lumpsucker with visible suction fin

Pacific spiny lumpsuckers are a globular-shaped fish that typically measures 1 to 3 inches (2.5 to 7.6 cm) in length, though the most common size is 1 inch (2.5 cm). It has a maximum known length of around 5 to 7 inches (13 to 18 cm).

They have a wide mouth with large lips, and protruding eyes. The fish also has a squared dorsal fin, rounded caudal fin, and thin, transparent pectoral fins.

The lumpsucker's pelvic fins have evolved into a large, fringed suction cup, allowing it to attach to surfaces like rocks or kelp. This sucker also compensates the fish for its lack of gas bladder. Because of their large, rounded shape with small fins, Pacific spiny lumpsuckers are ineffective swimmers and are most commonly found attached to solid objects.

They do not have scales. Instead, the body of the fish is covered in cone-shaped plates, called tubercles. Females have more tubercles than males.

The Pacific spiny lumpsucker is seen in many colors, including brown and green, often with yellow or orange highlights. Females are dull green in color, while males are dull orange to reddish brown.

=== Behavior ===
Pacific spiny lumpsuckers are often found alone in nature. When disturbed, they swim about aimlessly, hindered by their inefficient swimming. Instead, the fish relies on effective camouflage to avoid detection from predators. To prevent itself from being carried off by sea currents while sleeping, the Pacific spiny lumpsucker tends to use its suction-cup-like mouth to cling to nearby lumps of rock on the seafloor before losing consciousness, hence its name.

They are considered harmless to humans. In fact, they are known to eat out of the hands of divers.

== Distribution and habitat ==
Pacific spiny lumpsuckers are found from northern Washington state, especially Puget Sound, to the Aleutian Islands of Alaska. They can also be found in the Bering Sea, the Chukchi Sea and around northern Japan.

This species inhabits a wide variety of habitats, including eelgrass beds, rocky reefs, kelp patches, and other algae growth. They are also found around shallow bays and docks. The fish lives in near-shore waters to a depth of 480 to 500 feet (150 to 150 m).

== Ecology ==
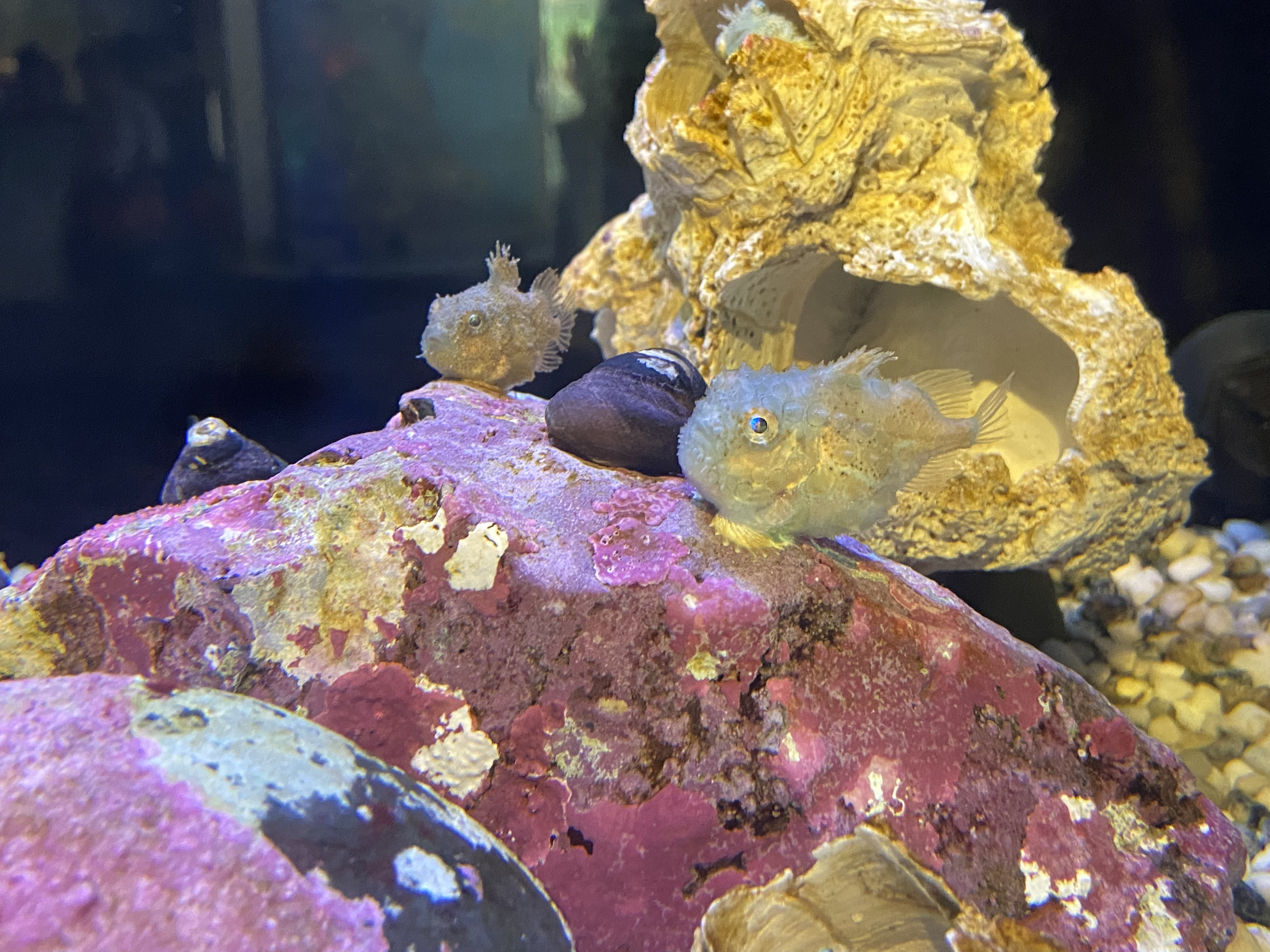
Pair of Pacific spiny lumpsuckers attached to a rock.

=== Diet ===
Pacific spiny lumpsuckers feed on slow crustaceans, polychaete worms, and mollusks on the sandy or muddy sea floor.

=== Reproduction ===
The species is known to spawn in shallow, warmer waters between the months of July and October. The females lay large, spherical, orange-colored eggs on rocks, in sheltered holes. Females typically lay around 200 eggs at a time in the nest and the male fertilizes them. After the eggs are laid, the male attaches himself to a nearby surface where he cares for the eggs by defending them from predators and circulating water over them with his fin to supply them with a steady flow of oxygen. The male will defend the clutch for three to eight weeks before the juvenile lumpsuckers hatch and venture out solitarily to find food within a few days.

The fluorescence of the males is a significant factor involved in reproduction and helps attract mates. Males are typically red and females are green in color. Males flash their rare red fluorescence when they are in close range of females to signal they are ready to mate. The fluorescence has been a successful evolutionary adaptation passed on because it increases success of reproduction.

=== Predators ===
Pacific cod, sablefish, marine sculpins, and lancefish are known predators of pacific spiny lumpsuckers. Crabs, sea stars and small fishes prey on lumpfish eggs.

== Climate change ==
While the Pacific spiny lumpsucker has been evaluated by the IUCN Red List as "Least Concern", climate change may pose a threat to the species. The fish relies on shallow waters for breeding and eelgrass for habitat. Rising sea levels and warmer water temperatures threaten these habitats, and the species' survival.

== Conservation ==
In the North Atlantic Ocean in areas such as Iceland and Norway, commercial lumpsucker fisheries raise and catch Cyclopterus lumpfish and their eggs for consumption. In northern Europe, both smoked lumpfish and lumpfish eggs, which can make for an inexpensive form of caviar, are sought after. For that reason, they are targeted during their spawning seasons from July to October to collect the roe from the female lumpsuckers. Though the Pacific spiny lumpsucker is not targeted, harmful fishing tactics in their habitats like trawling have caused their populations to decrease.
