= Georgiy B. Shul'pin =

Russian chemist (born 1946)

Georgiy Borisovich Shul’pin (Russian: Георгий Борисович Шульпи́н, also Shulpin, 22 July 1946 – 3 March 2023) was born in Moscow, Russia. He graduated with a M.S. degree in chemistry from the Chemistry Department of Moscow State University in 1969. Between 1969 and 1972, he was a postgraduate student at the Nesmeyanov Institute of Organoelement Compounds (Academy of Sciences of the USSR, Moscow) under the direction of Prof. A. N. Nesmeyanov and received his Ph.D. in organometallic chemistry in 1975. He received his Dr. of Sciences degree in 2013.

== Career ==
Since 1978, Shul’pin has been working at the N. N. Semenov Institute of Chemical Physics at the Russian Academy of Sciences in Moscow. He is currently a senior scientific researcher. His research activities concern metal complex catalysis, oxidation of hydrocarbons particularly using “green oxidants” H_{2}O_{2} and O_{2}, activation and functionalization of C–H bonds in saturated and aromatic hydrocarbons, organometallic chemistry. Other interests include photocatalysis, biomimetic oxidations and ecological chemistry.

In eighties Shul’pin together with A.E. Shilov discovered the metalation reaction of arenes by hexachloroplatinate which is stimulated by heating, light or gamma-irradiation and affords stable sigma-aryl Pt(IV) complexes (“Shul’pin’s reaction”).

He developed aerobic oxygenation of saturated hydrocarbons under visible light irradiation catalyzed by oxo and chloride complexes of transition metals and discovered three efficient systems for the catalytic oxidations with hydrogen peroxide. Catalytic combinations: i) “vanadium derivative plus pyrazine-2-carboxylic acid (PCA)”; ii) “a dinuclear manganese(IV) complex plus carboxylic acid”; iii) “an osmium complex plus amine”.

G. B. Shul’pin proposed a simple and convenient method for the estimation of concentration of alkyl hydroperoxides formed in alkane oxidations by molecular oxygen or peroxides. This method (gas-chromatographic analysis of the samples before and after their reduction by triphenylphosphine, “Shul’pin’s method”) is widely used in chemical practice.

G. B. Shul’pin has published about 250 papers in chemical journals. He is the author (coauthor) of monographs and reviews. He has also written numerous books on popular science (for example,) and articles in popular scientific journals.
