= Ezio Rizzardo =

Italian-Australian chemist

Ezio Rizzardo AC FAA FTSE FRS
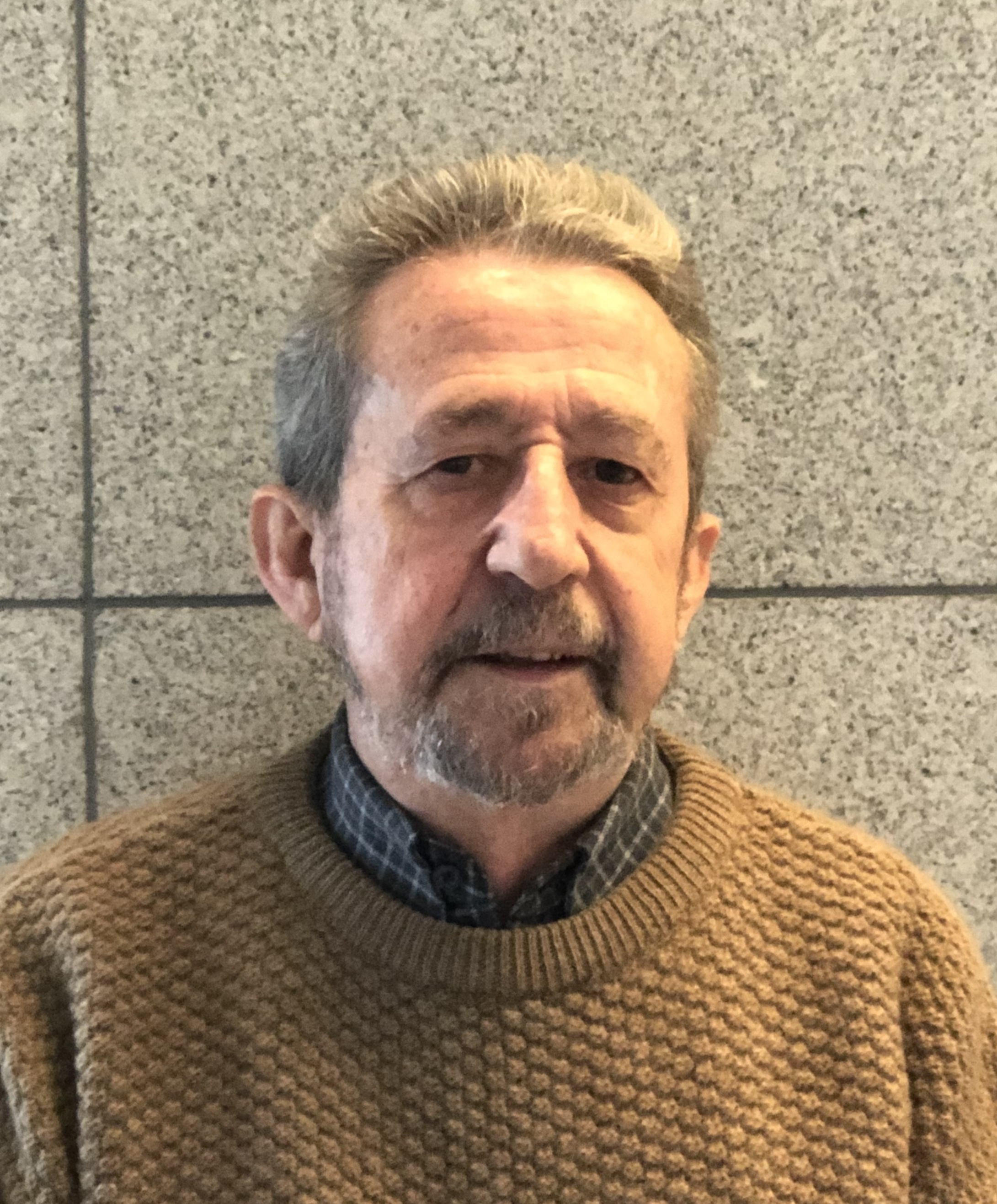
- Born: 26 December 1943 (age 82); Pederobba, Italy
- Citizenship: Australia
- Education: University of Sydney (PhD 1969)
- Known for: RAFT polymerization
- Scientific career
- Fields: polymer chemistry
- Workplaces: CSIRO
- Academic advisors: John Pinhey

Ezio Rizzardo AC FAA FTSE FRS (born 26 December 1943 in Pederobba, Italy) is a polymer chemist at the Australian research agency CSIRO.

== Biography ==
Born in Italy, Rizzardo's family immigrated to Australia in 1957. After graduating from the University of New South Wales, he studied the photochemistry of organic nitro compounds at the University of Sydney, receiving his PhD in organic chemistry in 1969. He has worked on polymer chemistry at CSIRO since 1976.

== Research ==
His research interests include the kinetics and mechanisms of radical polymerization, and their commercial application. Rizzardo is an acknowledged expert in chemical methods to control the polymer architecture produced by free radical polymerization. His innovations include two techniques for polymer synthesis, nitroxide-mediated radical polymerization (NMP) and reversible addition−fragmentation chain-transfer polymerization (RAFT). He is named as co-inventor on more than 40 patents.

== Awards and honours ==
Rizzardo has received multiple awards from CSIRO and the Royal Australian Chemical Institute for his achievements, as well as the Centenary Medal (2003) and the Prime Minister's Prize for Science (2011).

In 2014, research by Thomson Reuters for their citation laureate prize named Rizzardo as one of three CSIRO scientists who were likely contenders for the Nobel Prize in Chemistry, citing their work on RAFT. Rizzardo quipped that he would not be holding his breath on the night the prizes were announced. The trio had been awarded the ATSE Clunies-Ross Award earlier in the year.

He is a fellow of the Australian Academy of Technological Sciences and Engineering (1994), the Australian Academy of Science (2002) and the Royal Society (2010). He was appointed Companion of the Order of Australia in 2018.
