= Reversible addition−fragmentation chain-transfer polymerization =

Chemical reaction that produces polymers

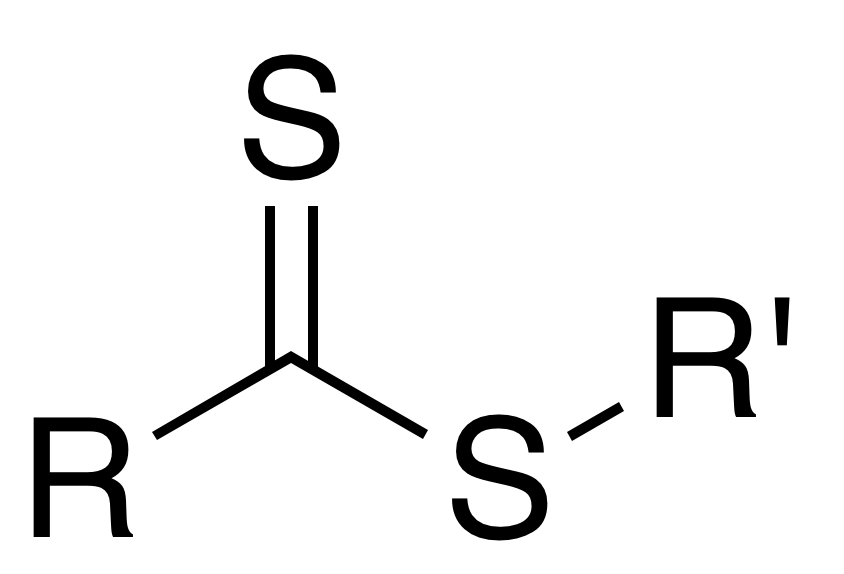
Figure 1. Structure of a thiocarbonylthio.

Reversible addition−fragmentation chain transfer or RAFT polymerization is one of several kinds of reversible deactivation radical polymerization. It makes use of a chain transfer agent (CTA) in the form of a thiocarbonylthio compound (or similar, from here on referred to as a RAFT agent, see Figure 1) to afford control over the generated molecular weight and dispersity during a free-radical polymerization. Discovered at the Commonwealth Scientific and Industrial Research Organization (CSIRO) of Australia in 1998, RAFT polymerization is one of several living or controlled radical polymerization techniques, others being atom transfer radical polymerization (ATRP) and nitroxide-mediated polymerization (NMP), etc. RAFT polymerization uses thiocarbonylthio compounds, such as dithioesters, thiocarbamates, and xanthates, to mediate the polymerization via a reversible chain transfer process. As with other controlled radical polymerization techniques, RAFT polymerizations can be performed under conditions that favor low dispersity Đ (narrow molecular weight distribution) and a pre-chosen molecular weight. RAFT polymerization can be used to design polymers of complex architectures, such as linear block copolymers, comb-like, star, brush polymers, dendrimers and cross-linked networks.

IUPAC definition

Reversible-addition-fragmentation chain-transfer polymerization (RAFT polymerization, RAFT): Degenerate-transfer radical polymerization in which chain activation and chain deactivation involve a degenerative chain-transfer process which occurs by a two-step addition-fragmentation mechanism. Note 1: Examples of RAFT agents include certain dithioesters, trithiocarbonates, xanthates (dithiocarbonates), and dithiocarbamates.

Note 2: RAFT with xanthates is also known as MADIX (macromolecular design by interchange of xanthate).

== Overview ==
=== History ===
The addition−fragmentation chain transfer process was first reported in the early 1970s. However, the technique was irreversible, so the transfer reagents could not be used to control radical polymerization at this time. For the first few years addition−fragmentation chain transfer was used to help synthesize end-functionalized polymers.

Scientists began to realize the potential of RAFT in controlled radical polymerization in the 1980s. Macromonomers were known as reversible chain transfer agents during this time, but had limited applications on controlled radical polymerization.

In 1995, a key step in the "degenerate" reversible chain transfer step for chain equilibration was brought to attention. The essential feature is that the product of chain transfer is also a chain transfer agent with similar activity to the precursor transfer agent.

RAFT polymerization today is mainly carried out by thiocarbonylthio chain transfer agents. It was first reported by Rizzardo et al. in 1998. RAFT is one of the most versatile methods of controlled radical polymerization because it is tolerant of a very wide range of functionality in the monomer and solvent, including aqueous solutions. RAFT polymerization has also been effectively carried out over a wide temperature range.

=== Important components of RAFT ===
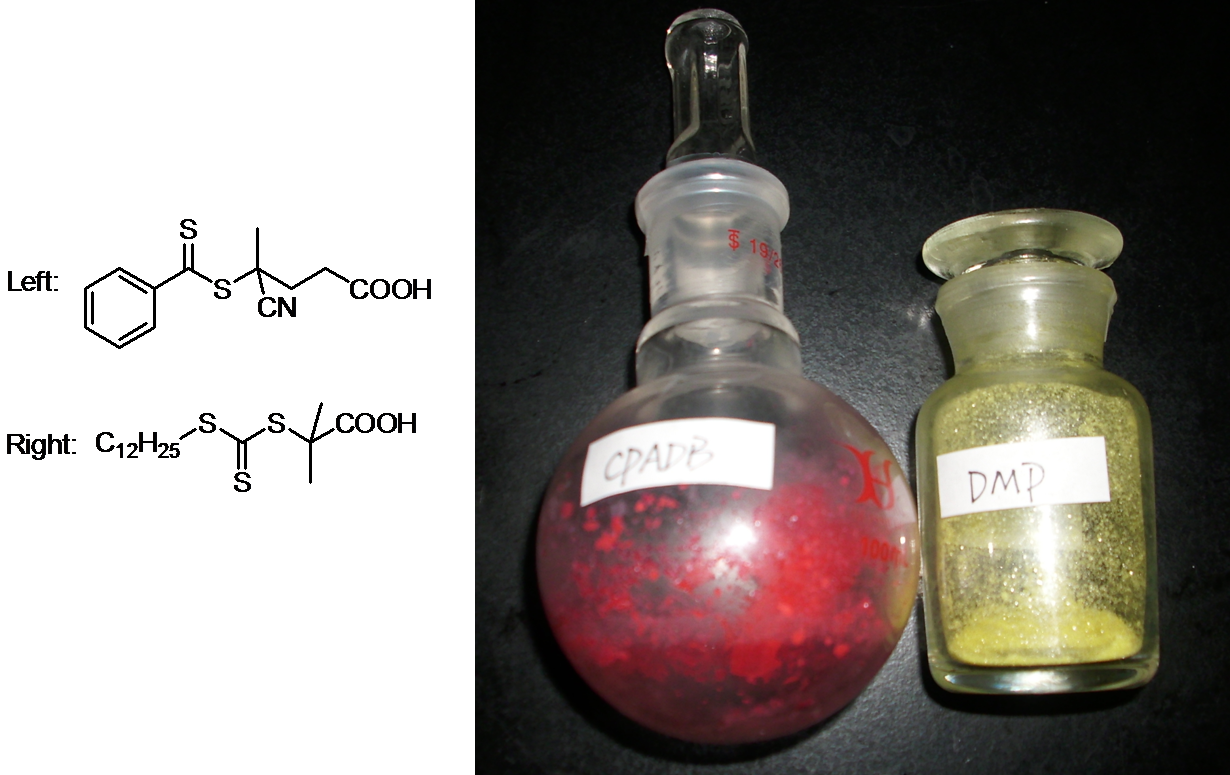
Figure 2. Two examples of RAFT agents.

Typically, a RAFT polymerization system consists of:

- a radical source (e.g. thermochemical initiator or the interaction of gamma radiation with some reagent)
- monomer
- RAFT agent
- solvent (not strictly required if the monomer is a liquid)

A temperature is chosen such that (a) chain growth occurs at an appropriate rate, (b) the chemical initiator (radical source) delivers radicals at an appropriate rate and (c) the central RAFT equilibrium (see later) favors the active rather than dormant state to an acceptable extent.

RAFT polymerization can be performed by adding a chosen quantity of an appropriate RAFT agent to a conventional free radical polymerization. Usually the same monomers, initiators, solvents and temperatures can be used.

Radical initiators such as azobisisobutyronitrile (AIBN) and 4,4'-azobis(4-cyanovaleric acid) (ACVA), also called 4,4'-azobis(4-cyanopentanoic acid), are widely used as the initiator in RAFT.

Figure 3 provides a visual description of RAFT polymerizations of poly(methyl methacrylate) and polyacrylic acid using AIBN as the initiator and two RAFT agents.

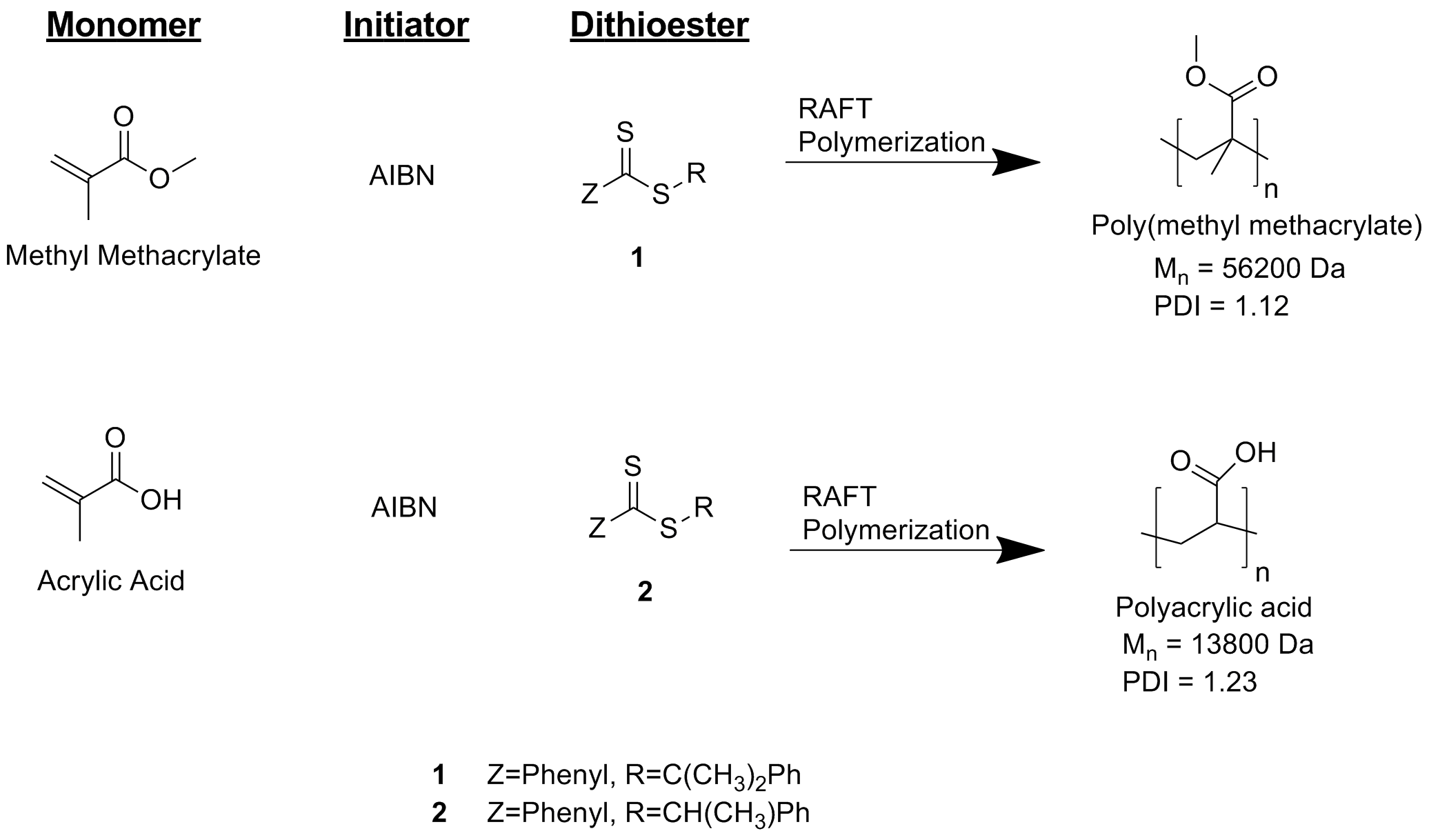
Figure 3. Examples of the major reagents and products in two RAFT polymerizations.

RAFT polymerization is known for its compatibility with a wide range of monomers compared to other controlled radical polymerizations. These monomers include (meth)acrylates, (meth)acrylamides, acrylonitrile, styrene and derivatives, butadiene, vinyl acetate and N-vinylpyrrolidone. The process is also suitable for use under a wide range of reaction parameters such as temperature or the level of impurities, as compared to NMP or ATRP.

The Z and R group of a RAFT agent must be chosen according to a number of considerations. The Z group primarily affects the stability of the S=C bond and the stability of the adduct radical (Polymer-S-C•(Z)-S-Polymer, see section on Mechanism). These in turn affect the position of and rates of the elementary reactions in the pre- and main-equilibrium. The R group must be able to stabilize a radical such that the right hand side of the pre-equilibrium is favored, but unstable enough that it can reinitiate growth of a new polymer chain. As such, a RAFT agent must be designed with consideration of the monomer and temperature, since both these parameters also strongly influence the kinetics and thermodynamics of the RAFT equilibria.

=== Products ===
The desired product of a RAFT polymerization is typically linear polymer with an R-group at one end and a dithiocarbonate moiety at the other end. Figure 4 depicts the major and minor products of a RAFT polymerization. All other products arise from (a) biradical termination events or (b) reactions of chemical species that originate from initiator fragments, denoted by I in the figure. (Note that categories (a) and (b) intersect).

The selectivity towards the desired product can be increased by increasing the concentration of RAFT agent relative to the quantity of free radicals delivered during the polymerization. This can be done either directly (i.e. by increasing the RAFT agent concentration) or by decreasing the rate of decomposition of or concentration of initiator.

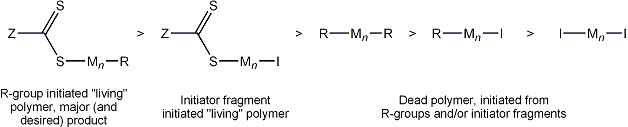
Figure 4. Major product of a RAFT polymerization (left) and other byproducts, arranged in order of decreasing prevalence.

== RAFT mechanism ==
=== Kinetics overview ===
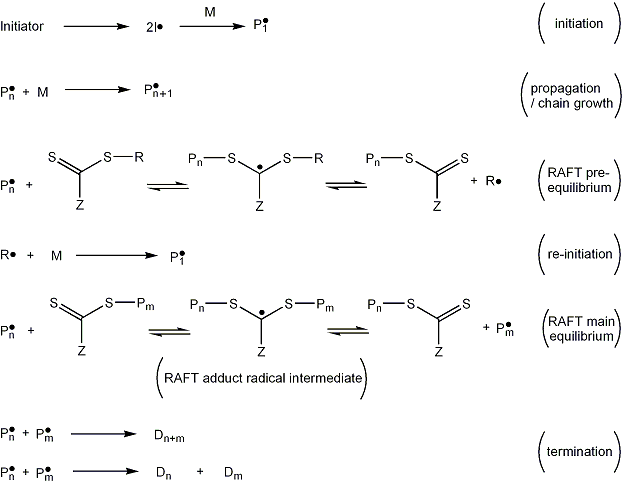
Figure 5. Simplified mechanism of the RAFT process.

RAFT is a type of living polymerization involving a conventional radical polymerization which is mediated by a RAFT agent. Monomers must be capable of radical polymerization. There are a number of steps in a RAFT polymerization: initiation, pre-equilibrium, re-initiation, main equilibrium, propagation and termination.

The mechanism is now explained further with the help of Figure 5.

Initiation: The reaction is started by a free-radical source which may be a decomposing radical initiator such as AIBN. In the example in Figure 5, the initiator decomposes to form two fragments (I•) which react with a single monomer molecule to yield a propagating (i.e. growing) polymeric radical of length 1, denoted P_{1}•.

Propagation: Propagating radical chains of length n in their active (radical) form, P_{n}•, add to monomer, M, to form longer propagating radicals, P_{n+1}•.

RAFT pre-equilibrium: A polymeric radical with n monomer units (P_{n}) reacts with the RAFT agent to form a RAFT adduct radical. This may undergo a fragmentation reaction in either direction to yield either the starting species or a radical (R•) and a polymeric RAFT agent (S=C(Z)S-P_{n}). This is a reversible step in which the intermediate RAFT adduct radical is capable of losing either the R group (R•) or the polymeric species (P_{n}•).

Re-initiation: The leaving group radical (R•) then reacts with another monomer species, starting another active polymer chain.

Main RAFT equilibrium: This is the most important part in the RAFT process, in which, by a process of rapid interchange, the present radicals (and hence opportunities for polymer chain growth) are "shared" among all species that have not yet undergone termination (P_{n}• and S=C(Z)S-P_{n}). Ideally the radicals are shared equally, causing chains to have equal opportunities for growth and a narrow PDI.

Termination: Chains in their active form react via a process known as bi-radical termination to form chains that cannot react further, known as dead polymer. Ideally, the RAFT adduct radical is sufficiently hindered such that it does not undergo termination reactions.

Video 1. Visual representation of RAFT polymerization (main RAFT equilibrium step). Green: CTA (the RAFT agent); Blue: monomers; Yellow: initiated polymer chains

A visual representation of this process can be seen in Video 1.

=== Thermodynamics of the main RAFT equilibrium ===
The position of the main RAFT equilibrium (Figure 5) is affected by the relative stabilities of the RAFT adduct radical (P_{n}-S-C•(Z)-S-P_{m}) and its fragmentation products, namely S=C(Z)S-P_{n} and polymeric radical (P_{m}•). If formation of the RAFT adduct radical is sufficiently thermodynamically favorable, the concentration of active species, P_{m}•, will be reduced to the extent that a reduction in the rate of conversion of monomer into polymer is also observed, as compared to an equivalent polymerization without RAFT agent. Such a polymerization, is referred to as a rate-retarded RAFT polymerization.

The rate of a RAFT polymerization, that is, the rate of conversion of monomer into polymer, mainly depends on the rate of the Propagation reaction (Figure 5) because the rate of initiation and termination are much higher than the rate of propagation. The rate of propagation is proportional to the concentration, [P•], of the active species P•, whereas the rate of the termination reaction, being second order, is proportional to the square [P•]^{2}. This means that during rate-retarded RAFT polymerizations, the rate of formation of termination products is suppressed to a greater extent than the rate of chain growth.

In RAFT polymerizations without rate-retardation, the concentration of the active species P• is close to that in an equivalent conventional polymerization in the absence of RAFT agent.

The main RAFT equilibrium and hence the rate retardation of the reaction is influenced by both temperature and chemical factors. A high temperature favors formation of the fragmentation products rather than the adduct radical P_{n}-S-C•(Z)-S-P_{m}. RAFT agents with a radical stabilising Z-group such as Phenyl group favor the adduct radical, as do propagating radicals whose monomers lack radical stabilising features, for example Vinyl acetate.

=== Further mechanistic considerations ===
In terms of mechanism, an ideal RAFT polymerization has several features. The pre-equilibrium and re-initiation steps are completed very early in the polymerization meaning that the major product of the reaction (the RAFT polymer chains, RAFT-P_{n}), all start growing at approximately the same time. The forward and reverse reactions of the main RAFT equilibrium are fast, favoring equal growth opportunities amongst the chains. The total number of radicals delivered to the system by the initiator during the course of the polymerization is low compared to the number of RAFT agent molecules, meaning that the R group initiated polymer chains from the re-initiation step form the majority of the chains in the system, rather than initiator fragment bearing chains formed in the Initiation step. This is important because initiator decomposes continuously during the polymerization, not just at the start, and polymer chains arising from initiator decomposition cannot, therefore, have a narrow length distribution. These mechanistic features lead to an average chain length that increases linearly with the conversion of monomer into polymer.

In contrast to other controlled radical polymerizations (for example ATRP), a RAFT polymerization does not achieve controlled evolution of molecular weight and low polydispersity by reducing bi-radical termination events (although in some systems, these events may indeed be reduced somewhat, as outlined above), but rather, by ensuring that most polymer chains start growing at approximately the same time and experience equal growth during polymerization.

==== Role of Z and R groups on RAFT agent ====
Guidelines for Z and R groups depend on their functions and which types monomers are required to be polymerized.

R group:

- It must be a good homolytic leaving group relative to Pn (shifts main equilibrium towards macro-CTA and R radical)
- It should reinitiate polymerization efficiently

Choice of Z group affects:

- Rate of addition of propagating polymer to the thiocarbonyl of intermediate species
- Rate of fragmentation of intermediate radicals

Figure 6. Possible R groups in a RAFT agent listed in decreasing order of reactivity. Monomers recommended: 1-3: MMA, HPMAM; 4: MMA, HPMAM (partial control); 1-10: St, MA, AM, AN; 4, 6 and 9: VAc, NVP, NVC; 1-3, 5, 7, 8 and 10: VAc, NVP, NVC (partial control)

Figure 7. RAFT agent Z groups in decreasing order of reactivity. Recommended monomers: 1-4: MMA, HPMAM; 5: MMA, HPMAM (partial control); 7-11: VAc, NVP; 1-6: St, MA, AM, AN; 7-10: St, MA, AM, AN (partial control)

Guidelines have been provided for selection of R and Z groups based on the monomer to be polymerized and these are summarized in Figures 6 and 7. Monomers can be divided into more active and less active, called MAM and LAM, respectively. MAM will yield less active propagating radical species, and vice versa for LAM. Therefore, MAM requires more active RAFT reagents, while LAM requires less active reagents.

==== Important ratios between reaction components ====
During RAFT synthesis, some ratios between reaction components are important and usually can be used to control or set the desired degree of polymerization and polymer molecular weight. All the following ratios are relative to initial moles:

1. Monomer to RAFT reagent: gives the expected degree of polymerization (that is, the number of monomer units in each polymer chain) and can be used to estimate the molecular weight of the polymer by Equation (1) (see below).
2. RAFT reagent to initiator: determines the end groups on the polymer chains. For the α end, this ratio gives the number of chains that come from the R group (4th step in Figure 5) to the number of chains that come from the initiator (2nd step in Figure 5). For the ω end, it gives the proportion of dormant polymer chains (those with a thiocarbonylthio at the end) to dead chains.
3. Monomer to initiator: similar to other radical polymerization techniques, for which the rate of propagation is proportional to the concentration of monomer and the square root of initiator concentration.

Equation (1):

$MW_n = \frac{(M_0 - M_t)}{RAFT_0}MW_M + MW_{RAFT}$

Where MW_{n} is the molecular weight of the polymer, M_{0} and M_{t} are the initial and final moles of monomer, respectively, RAFT_{0} is the initial moles of RAFT agent, MW_{M} is the molecular weight of the monomer and MW_{RAFT} is the molecular weight of the RAFT agent. M_{0} - M_{t} can also be rewritten as M_{0}*X (where X is conversion), so that the average molecular weight of the polymer can be estimated based on conversion.

== Enz-RAFT ==
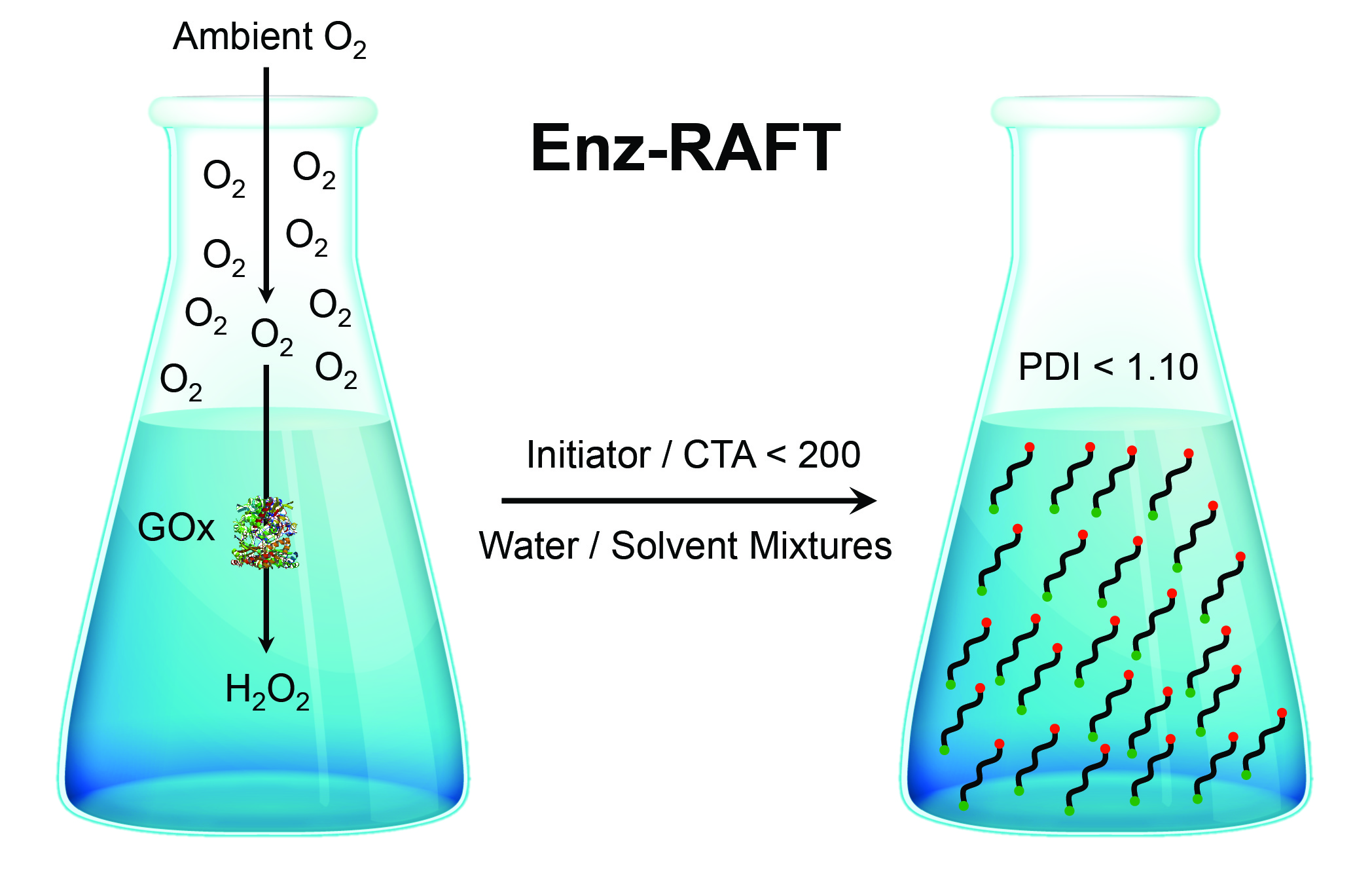
Glucose oxidase (GOx) is used to remove oxygen from the solution, allowing RAFT polymerizations to proceed in an open vessel.

Enz-RAFT is a RAFT polymerization technique which allows for controlled oxygen-sensitive polymerization in an open vessel. Enz-RAFT uses 1–4 μM glucose oxidase (GOx) to remove dissolved oxygen from the system, forming hydrogen peroxide. As the degassing is decoupled from the polymerization, initiator concentrations can be reduced, allowing for high control and end group fidelity. Enz-RAFT can be used in a number of organic solvent systems, with high activity in up to 80% tert-butanol, acetonitrile, and dioxane. With Enz-RAFT, polymerizations do not require prior degassing making this technique convenient for the preparation of most polymers by RAFT. The technique was developed at Imperial College London by Robert Chapman and Adam Gormley in the lab of Molly Stevens.

H_{2}O_{2} formed from GOx can undergo further reduction in the presence of iron(II) to form hydroxyl radicals through Fenton redox chemistry. Control over the enzymatic production of these initiating radicals has enabled access to ultra-high molecular weight (UHMW, ≥1,000,000 g/mol) polymers in excess of 19.7 MDa.

== Applications ==
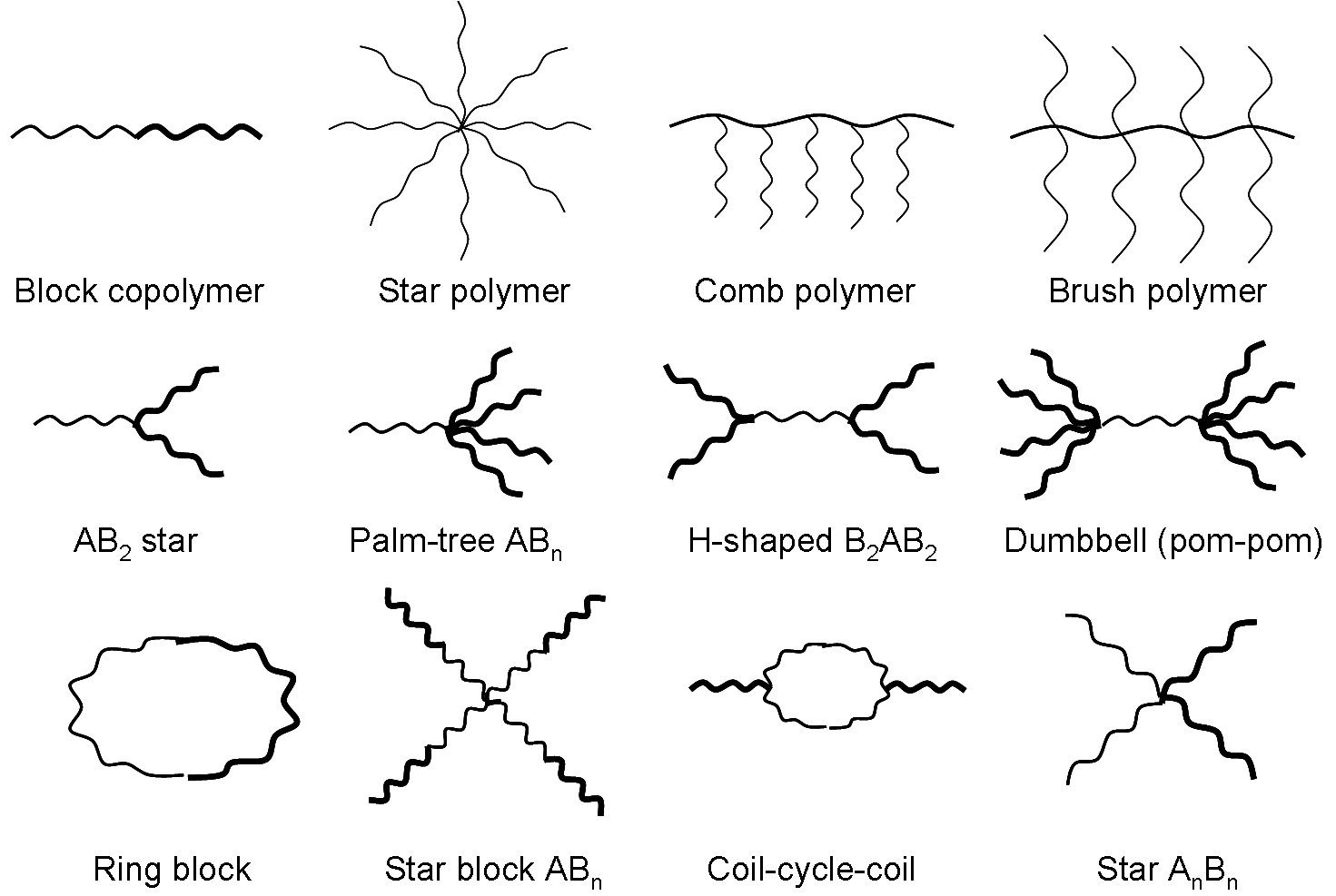
Figure 8. Complex architectures accessible via the RAFT process.

RAFT polymerization has been used to synthesize a wide range of polymers with controlled molecular weight and low dispersities (between 1.05 and 1.4 for many monomers).

RAFT polymerization is known for its compatibility with a wide range of monomers as compared to other controlled radical polymerizations. Some monomers capable of polymerizing by RAFT include styrenes, acrylates, acrylamides, and many vinyl monomers. Additionally, the RAFT process allows the synthesis of polymers with specific macromolecular architectures such as block, gradient, statistical, comb, brush, star, hyperbranched, and network copolymers. These properties make RAFT useful in many types of polymer synthesis.

=== Block copolymers ===
As with other living radical polymerization techniques, RAFT allows chain extension of a polymer of one monomer with a second type of polymer to yield a block copolymer. In such a polymerization, there is the additional challenge that the RAFT agent for the first monomer must also be suitable for the second monomer, making block copolymerization of monomers of highly disparate character challenging.

Figure 9. Decreasing order of reactivity for macro-R groups for the polymerization of block copolymers: Recommended monomers: 1-2: MMA, HPMAM; 1-5: St, MA, DMAm; 6: St, MA, DMAm (partial control); 1-2 and 4-8: NVC, NVP, VAc; 3: NVC (partial control)

For block copolymers, different guidelines exist for selecting the macro-R agent for polymerizing the second block (Figure 9).

Multiblock copolymers have also been reported by using difunctional R groups or symmetrical trithiocarbonates with difunctional Z groups.

=== Star, brush and comb polymers ===
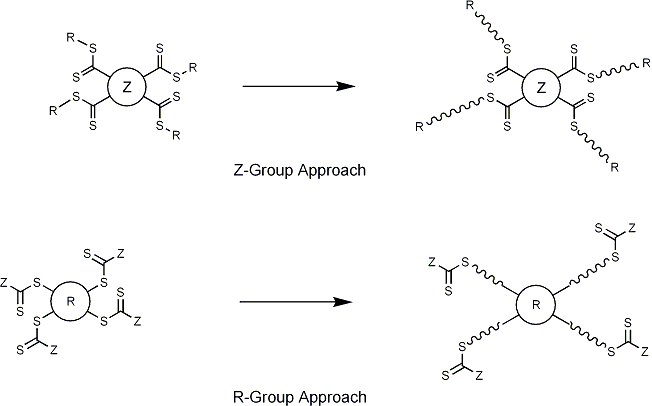
Figure 10. RAFT R-group approach v.s. Z-group approach.

Using a compound with multiple dithio moieties (often termed a multifunctional RAFT agent) can result in the formation of star, brush and comb polymers. Taking star polymers as an example, RAFT differs from other forms of living radical polymerization techniques in that either the R- or Z-group may form the core of the star (See Figure 10). While utilizing the R-group as the core results in similar structures found using ATRP or NMP, the ability to use the Z-group as the core makes RAFT unique. When the Z-group is used, the reactive polymeric arms are detached from the star's core during growth and to undergo chain transfer, must once again react at the core.

=== Smart materials and biological applications ===
Due to its flexibility with respect to the choice of monomers and reaction conditions, the RAFT process competes favorably with other forms of living polymerization for the generation of bio-materials. New types of polymers are able to be constructed with unique properties, such as temperature and pH sensitivity.

Specific materials and their applications include polymer-protein and polymer-drug conjugates, mediation of enzyme activity, molecular recognition processes and polymeric micelles which can deliver a drug to a specific site in the body. RAFT has also been used to graft polymer chains onto polymeric surfaces, for example, polymeric microspheres.

== RAFT compared to other controlled polymerizations ==
=== Advantages ===
Polymerization can be performed in large range of solvents (including water), within a wide temperature range, high functional group tolerance and absent of metals for polymerization. As of 2014, the range of commercially available RAFT agents covers close to all the monomer classes that can undergo radical polymerization.

=== Disadvantages ===
A particular RAFT agent is only suitable for a limited set of monomers and the synthesis of a RAFT agent typically requires a multistep synthetic procedure and subsequent purification. RAFT agents can be unstable over long time periods, are highly colored and can have a pungent odor due to gradual decomposition of the dithioester moiety to yield small sulfur compounds. The presence of sulfur and color in the resulting polymer may also be undesirable for some applications; however, this can, to an extent, be eliminated with further chemical and physical purification steps.

== See also ==
- Radical (chemistry)
- Copolymer
- Living polymerization
- ATRP (chemistry)
- NMP
