= C12H16N4O4 =

The molecular formula C_{12}H_{16}N_{4}O_{4} (molar mass: 280.28 g/mol, exact mass: 280.1172 u) may refer to:

- 4,4'-Azobis(4-cyanopentanoic_acid) (ACPA)
- MK-608
