= End group =

Functional group at the extremity of an oligomer or other macromolecule

End groups are an important aspect of polymer synthesis and characterization. In polymer chemistry, they are functional groups that are at the very ends of a macromolecule or oligomer (IUPAC). In polymer synthesis, like condensation polymerization and free-radical types of polymerization, end-groups are commonly used and can be analyzed by nuclear magnetic resonance (NMR) to determine the average length of the polymer. Other methods for characterization of polymers where end-groups are used are mass spectrometry and vibrational spectrometry, like infrared and raman spectroscopy. These groups are important for the analysis of polymers and for grafting to and from a polymer chain to create a new copolymer. One example of an end group is in the polymer poly(ethylene glycol) diacrylate where the end-groups are circled.

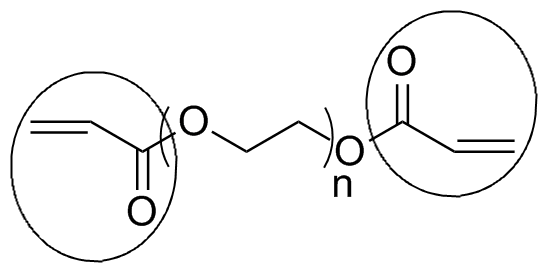
End group example of poly(ethylene glycol) diacrylate with the end groups circled

IUPAC definition

End-group: Constitutional unit that is an extremity of a macromolecule or oligomer molecule

== End groups in polymer synthesis ==
End groups are seen on all polymers and the functionality of those end groups can be important in determining the application of polymers. Each type of polymerization (free radical, condensation or etc.) has end groups that are typical for the polymerization, and knowledge of these can help to identify the type of polymerization method used to form the polymer.

=== Step-growth polymerization ===
Step-growth polymerization involves two monomers with bi- or multifunctionality to form polymer chains. Many polymers are synthesized via step-growth polymerization and include polyesters, polyamides, and polyurethanes. A sub-class of step-growth polymerization is condensation polymerization.

==== Condensation polymerization ====
Condensation polymerization is an important class of step-growth polymerization, which is formed simply by the reaction of two monomers and results in the release of a water molecule. Since these polymers are typically made up of two or more monomers, the resulting end groups are from the monomer functionality. Examples of condensation polymers can be seen with polyamides, polyacetals and polyesters. An example of polyester is polyethylene terephthalate (PET), which is made from the monomers terephthalic acid and ethylene glycol. If one of the components in the polymerization is in excess, then that polymers functionality will be at the ends of the polymers (a carboxylic acid or alcohol group respectively).

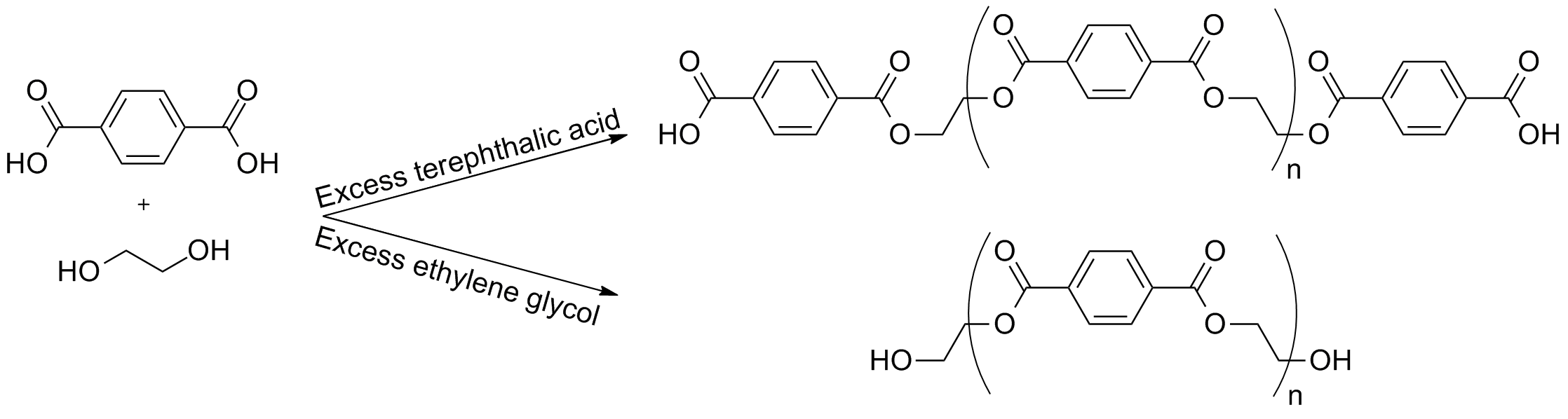
PET condensation polymerization from terephthalic and ethylene glycol, showing what occurs when each monomer is in excess

=== Free radical polymerization ===
The end groups that are found on polymers formed through free radical polymerization are a result from the initiators and termination method used. There are many types of initiators used in modern free radical polymerizations, and below are examples of some well-known ones. For example, azobisisobutyronitrile or AIBN forms radicals that can be used as the end groups for new starting polymer chains with styrene to form polystyrene. Once the polymer chain has formed and the reaction is terminated, the end group opposite from the initiator is a result of the terminating agent or the chain transfer agent used.

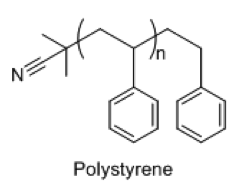
Polystyrene initiated with AIBN

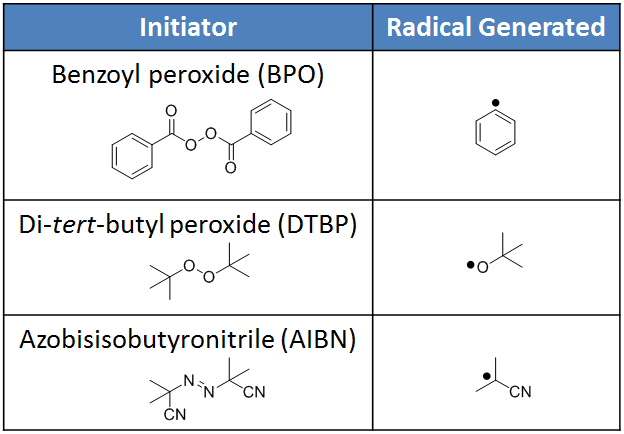
Initiators for free-radical polymerizations

== End groups in graft polymers ==
Graft copolymers are generated by attaching chains of one monomer to the main chain of another polymer; a branched block copolymer is formed. Furthermore, end groups play an important role in the process of initiation, propagation and termination of graft polymers. Graft polymers can be achieved by either "grafting from" or "grafting to"; these different methods are able to produce a vast array of different polymer structures, which can be tailored to the application in question. The "grafting from" approach involves, for example, generation of radicals along a polymer chain, which can then be reacted with monomers to grow a new polymer from the backbone of another. In "grafting from," the initiation sites on the backbone of the first polymer can be part of the backbone structure originally or generated in situ. The "grafting to" approach involves the reaction of functionalized monomers to a polymer backbone. In graft polymers, end groups play an important role, for example, in the "grafting to" technique the generation of the reactive functionalized monomers occurs at the end group, which is then tethered to the polymer chain. There are various methods to synthesize graft polymers some of the more common include redox reaction to produce free radicals, by free radical polymerization techniques avoiding chain termination (ATRP, RAFT, nitroxide mediated, for example) and step-growth polymerization. A schematic of "grafting from" and "grafting to" is illustrated in the figure below.

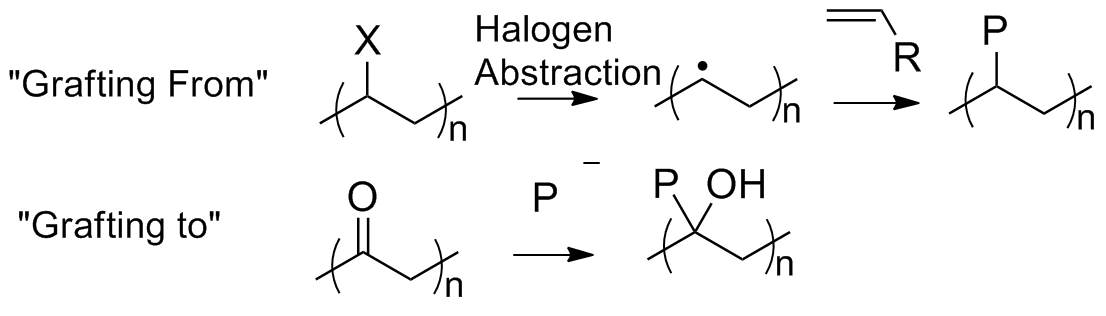

The "grafting from" technique involves the generation of radicals along the polymer backbone from an abstraction of a halogen, from either the backbone or a functional group along the backbone. Monomers are reacted with the radicals along the backbone and subsequently generate polymers which are grafted from the backbone of the first polymer. The schematic for "grafting to" shows an example using anionic polymerizations, the polymer containing the carbonyl functionalities gets attacked by the activated polymer chain and generates a polymer attached to the associated carbon along with an alcohol group, in this example. These examples show us the potential of fine tuning end groups of polymer chains to target certain copolymer structures.

== Analysis of polymers using end groups ==
Because of the importance of end groups, there have been many analytical techniques developed for the identification of the groups. The three main methods for analyzing the identity of the end group are by NMR, mass spectrometry (MS) or vibrational spectroscopy (IR or Raman). Each technique has its advantages and disadvantages, which are details below.

=== NMR spectroscopy ===
The advantage of NMR for end groups is that it allows for not only the identification of the end group units, but also allows for the quantification of the number-average length of the polymer. End-group analysis with NMR requires that the polymer be soluble in organic or aqueous solvents. Additionally, the signal on the end-group must be visible as a distinct spectral frequency, i.e. it must not overlap with other signals. As molecular weight increases, the width of the spectral peaks also increase. As a result of this, methods which rely on resolution of the end-group signal are mostly used for polymers of low molecular weight (roughly less than 20,000 g/mol number-average molecular weight). By using the information obtained from the integration of a ^{1}H NMR spectrum, the degree of polymerization (X_{n}) can be calculated. With knowledge of the identity of the end groups/repeat unit and the number of protons contained on each, the X_{n} can then be calculated. For this example above, once the 1H NMR has been integrated and the values have been normalized to 1, the degree of polymerization is calculated by simply dividing the normalized value for the repeat unit by the number of protons continued in the repeat unit. For this case, X_{n} = n = 100/2, and therefore X_{n} = 50, or there are 50 repeat units in this monomer.

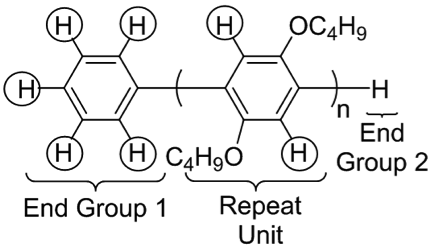
Example of utility of NMR for end group analysis

=== Mass spectrometry ===
Mass spectrometry (MS) is helpful for the determination of the molecular weight of the polymer, structure of the polymer, etc. Although chemists utilize many kinds of MS, the two that are used most typically are matrix-assisted laser desorption ionization/time of flight (MALDI-TOF) and electrospray ionization-mass spectroscopy (ESI-MS). One of the biggest disadvantages of this technique is that much like NMR spectroscopy the polymers have to be soluble in some organic solvent. An advantage of using MALDI is that it provides the simpler data to interpret for end group identification compared with ESI, but a disadvantage is that the ionization can be rather hard and as a result some end groups do not remain intact for analysis. Because of the harsh ionization in MALDI, one of the biggest advantages of using ESI is for its "softer" ionization methods. The disadvantage of using ESI is that the data obtained can be very complex due to the mechanism of the ionization and thus can be difficult to interpret.

=== Vibrational spectroscopy ===
The vibrational spectroscopy methods used to analyze the end groups of a polymer are infrared (IR) and Raman spectroscopy. These methods are useful in fact that the polymers do not need to be soluble in a solvent and spectra can be obtained simply from solid material. A disadvantage of the technique is that only qualitative data is typically obtained on the identification end groups.

== End group removal ==
Controlled radical polymerization, namely reversible addition−fragmentation chain-transfer polymerization (RAFT), is a common method for the polymerization of acrylates, methacrylates and acrylamides. Usually, a thiocarbonate is used in combination with an effective initiator for RAFT. The thiocarbonate moiety can be functionalized at the R-group for end group analysis. The end group is a result of the propagation of chain-transfer agents during the free-radical polymerization process. The end groups can subsequently be modified by the reaction of the thiocarbonylthio compounds with nucleophiles and ionic reducing agents.

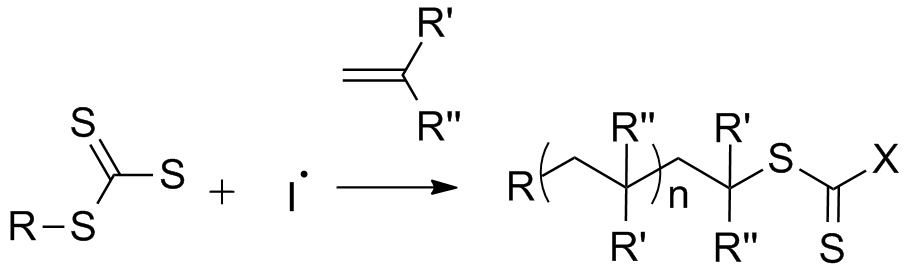
RAFT polymerization

The method for removal of thiocarbonyl containing end groups includes reacting the polymers containing the end-groups with en excess of radicals which add to the reactive C=S bond of the end group forming an intermediate radical (shown below). The remaining radical on the polymer chain can be hydrogenated by what is referred to as a trapping group and terminate; this results in a polymer that is free of the end groups at the α and ω positions.

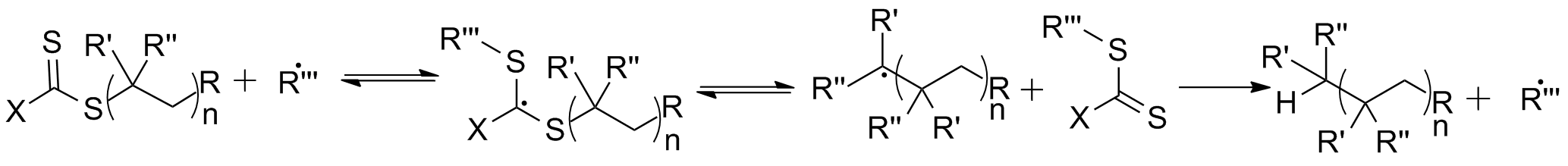
RAFT polymerization mechanism

Another method of end group removal for the thiocarbonyl containing end-groups of RAFT polymers is the addition of heat to the polymer; this is referred to as thermolysis. One method of monitoring thermolysis of RAFT polymers is by thermogravimetric analysis resulting in a weight-loss of the end group. An advantage of this technique is that no additional chemicals are required to remove the end group; however, it is required that the polymer be thermally stable to high temperature and therefore may not be effective for some polymers. Depending on the polymers sensitivity to ultraviolet radiation (UV) it has been reported in recent years that decomposition of end-groups can be effective, but preliminary data suggest that decomposition by UV leads to a change in the distribution of molecular weights of the polymer.

=== Surface modification using RAFT ===
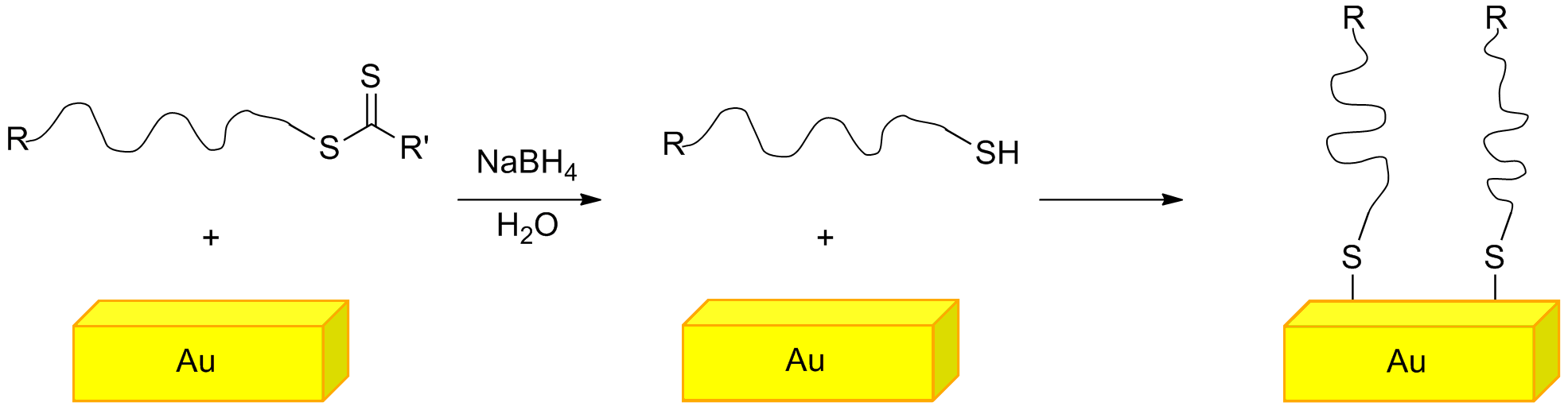
Grafting polymer on a gold surface utilizing the thiol functional end group

Surface modification has gained a lot of interest in recent years for a variety of applications. An example of the application of free radical polymerizations to forming new architectures is through RAFT polymerizations which result in dithioester end groups. These dithioesters can be reduced to the thiol which can be immobilized on a metal surface; this is important for applications in electronics, sensing and catalysis. The schematic below demonstrates the immobilization of copolymers onto a gold surface as reported for poly(sodium 4-styrenesulfonate) by the McCormick group at the University of Southern Mississippi.
