= Macromonomer =

Large molecule with an end-group enabling it to polymerize

IUPAC definition

Macromonomer molecule: A macromolecule that has one end-group which
enables it to act as a monomer molecule, contributing only a single monomeric unit
to a chain of the final macromolecule.

In polymer chemistry, a macromonomer (or macromer) is a macromolecule with one end-group that enables it to act as a reactive monomer and undergo further polymerization. Macromonomers will contribute a single repeat unit to a chain of the completed macromolecule.

Several macromonomers have been successfully synthesized utilizing various methods such as controlled radical polymerization (CRP) and copper-catalyzed "click" coupling.

Due to the larger size of macromonomers (as opposed to the size of regular monomers), synthetic challenges are brought about, giving reason for the analysis of polymerization mechanisms. Recent studies have shown that macromonomer polymerization kinetics and mechanisms can be significantly affected by the topological effect.

Macromonomers are also used in controlled graft copolymerization.
