= Graft polymer =

Polymer with a backbone of one composite and random branches of another composite

IUPAC definitions

graft macromolecule: A macromolecule with one or more species of block connected
to the main chain as side-chains, these side-chains having constitutional or configurational
features that differ from those in the main chain.

comb macromolecule: A macromolecule comprising a main chain with multiple
trifunctional branch points from each of which a linear side-chain emanates.

Notes

1. If the subchains between the branch points of the main chain and the terminal
subchains of the main chain are identical with respect to constitution and degree
of polymerization, and the side chains are identical with respect to constitution
and degree of polymerization, the macromolecule is termed a ’’regular
comb macromolecule’’. 2. If at least some of the branch points are of functionality greater than three, the
macromolecule may be termed a ‘’brush macromolecule’’.

In polymer chemistry, graft polymers are segmented copolymers with a linear backbone of one composite and randomly distributed branches of another composite. The picture labeled "graft polymer" shows how grafted chains of species B are covalently bonded to polymer species A. Although the side chains are structurally distinct from the main chain, the individual grafted chains may be homopolymers or copolymers. Graft polymers have been synthesized for many decades and are especially used as impact resistant materials, thermoplastic elastomers, compatibilizers, or emulsifiers for the preparation of stable blends or alloys. One of the better-known examples of a graft polymer is a component used in high impact polystyrene, consisting of a polystyrene backbone with polybutadiene grafted chains.

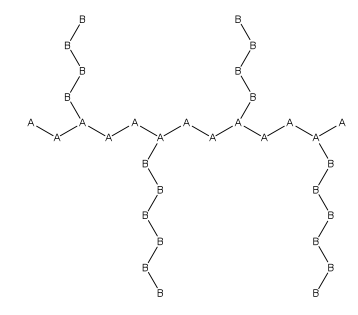
The graft copolymer consists of a main polymer chain or backbone (A) covalently bonded to one or more side chains (B)

== General properties ==
Graft copolymers are a branched copolymer where the components of the side chain are structurally different than that of the main chain. Graft copolymers containing a larger quantity of side chains are capable of wormlike conformation, compact molecular dimension, and notable chain end effects due to their confined and tight fit structures. The preparation of graft copolymers has been around for decades. All synthesis methods can be employed to create general physical properties of graft copolymers. They can be used for materials that are impact resistant, and are often used as thermoplastics elastomers, compatibilizers or emulsifiers for the preparation of stable blends or alloys. Generally, grafting methods for copolymer synthesis results in materials that are more thermostable than their homopolymer counterparts. There are three methods of synthesis, grafting to, grafting from, and grafting through, that are used to construct a graft polymer.

== Synthesis methods ==
There are many different approaches to synthesizing graft copolymers. Usually they employ familiar polymerization techniques that are commonly used such as atom transfer radical polymerization (ATRP), ring-opening metathesis polymerization (ROMP), anionic and cationic polymerizations, and free radical living polymerization. Some other polymerization methods include photografting, radiation-induced polymerization, ring-opening olefin metathesis polymerization, polycondensation reactions, and iniferter-induced polymerization.

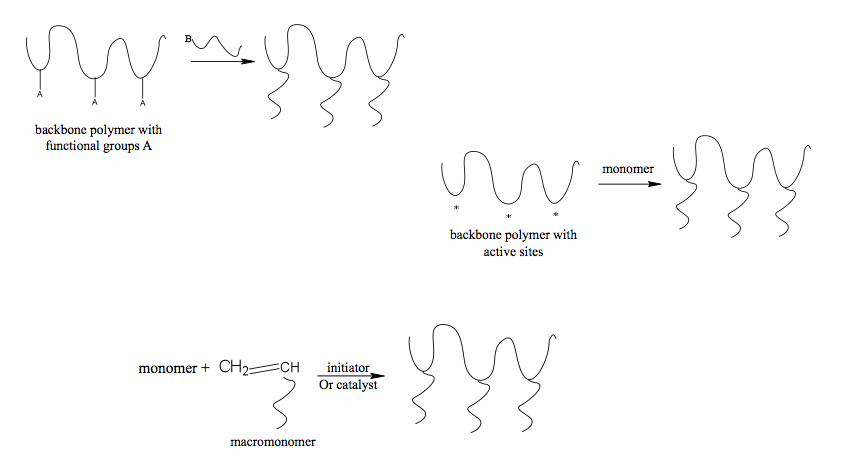
The three common methods of synthesis: grafting to (top left), grafting from (middle right), grafting through (bottom left), and their generalized reaction scheme are featured.

=== Grafting to ===
The grafting to method involves the use of a backbone chain with functional groups A that are distributed randomly along the chain. The formation of the graft copolymer originates from the coupling reaction between the functional backbone and the end-groups of the branches that are reactive. These coupling reactions are made possible by modifying the backbone chemically. Common reaction mechanisms used to synthesize these copolymers include free-radical polymerization, anionic polymerization, atom-transfer radical-polymerization, and living polymerization techniques.

Copolymers that are prepared with the grafting-to method often utilize anionic polymerization techniques. This method uses a coupling reaction of the electrophilic groups of the backbone polymer and the propagation site of an anionic living polymer. This method would not be possible without the generation of a backbone polymer that has reactive groups. This method has become more popular with the rise of click chemistry. A high yield chemical reaction called atom transfer nitroxide radical coupling chemistry is for the grafting-to method for polymerization.

=== Grafting from ===
In the grafting-from method, the macromolecular backbone is chemically modified in order to introduce active sites capable of initiating functionality. The initiating sites can be incorporated by copolymerization, can be incorporated in a post-polymerization reaction, or can already be a part of the polymer. If the number of active sites along the backbone participates in the formation of one branch, then the number of chains grafted to the macromolecule can be controlled by the number of active sites. Even though the number of grafted chains can be controlled, there may be a difference in the lengths of each grafted chain due to kinetic and steric hindrance effects.

Grafting from reactions have been conducted from polyethylene, polyvinylchloride, and polyisobutylene. Different techniques such as anionic grafting, cationic grafting, atom-transfer radical polymerization, and free-radical polymerization have been used in the synthesis of grafting from copolymers.

Graft copolymers that are employed with the grafting-from method are often synthesized with ATRP reactions and anionic and cationic grafting techniques.

=== Grafting through ===
The grafting through, also known as the macromonomer method, is one of the simpler ways of synthesizing a graft polymer with well defined side chains. Typically a monomer of a lower molecular weight is copolymerized with free radicals with an acrylate functionalized macromonomer. The ratio of monomer to macromonomer molar concentrations as well as their copolymerization behavior determines the number of chains that are grafted. As the reaction proceeds, the concentrations of monomer to macromonomer change causing random placement of branches and formation of graft copolymers with different number of branches. This method allows for branches to be added heterogeneously or homogeneously based on the reactivity ratio of the terminal functional group on the macromolecular to the monomer. The difference in distribution of grafts has significant effects on the physical properties of the grafted copolymer. Polyethylene, polysiloxanes and poly(ethylene oxide) are all macromonomers that have been incorporated in a polystyrene or poly(methyl acrylate) backbone.

The macromonomer (grafting through) method can be employed using any known polymerization technique. Living polymerizations give special control over the molecular weight, molecular weight distribution, and chain-end functionalization.

== Applications ==
Graft copolymers became widely studied due to their increased number of applications like in drug delivery vehicles, surfactants, water filtration, rheology modifiers, etc. It is their unique structures relative to other copolymers such as alternating, periodic, statistical, and block copolymers.

Some common applications of graft copolymers include:

- Membranes for the separation of gases or liquids
- Hydrogels
- Drug deliverers
- Thermoplastic elastomers
- Compatibilizers for polymer blends
- Polymeric emulsifiers
- Impact resistant plastics

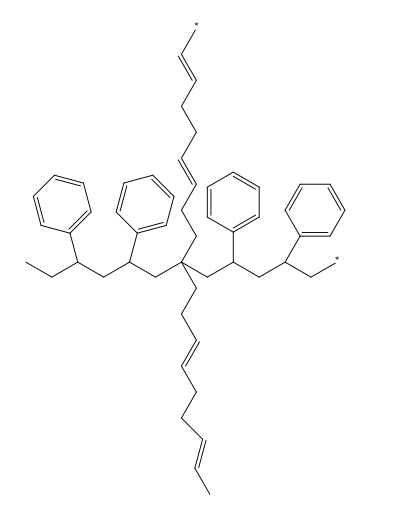
High Impact Polystyrene (HIPS) consists of the polystyrene backbone with polybutadiene chains branching from it in each direction.

=== High impact polystyrene ===
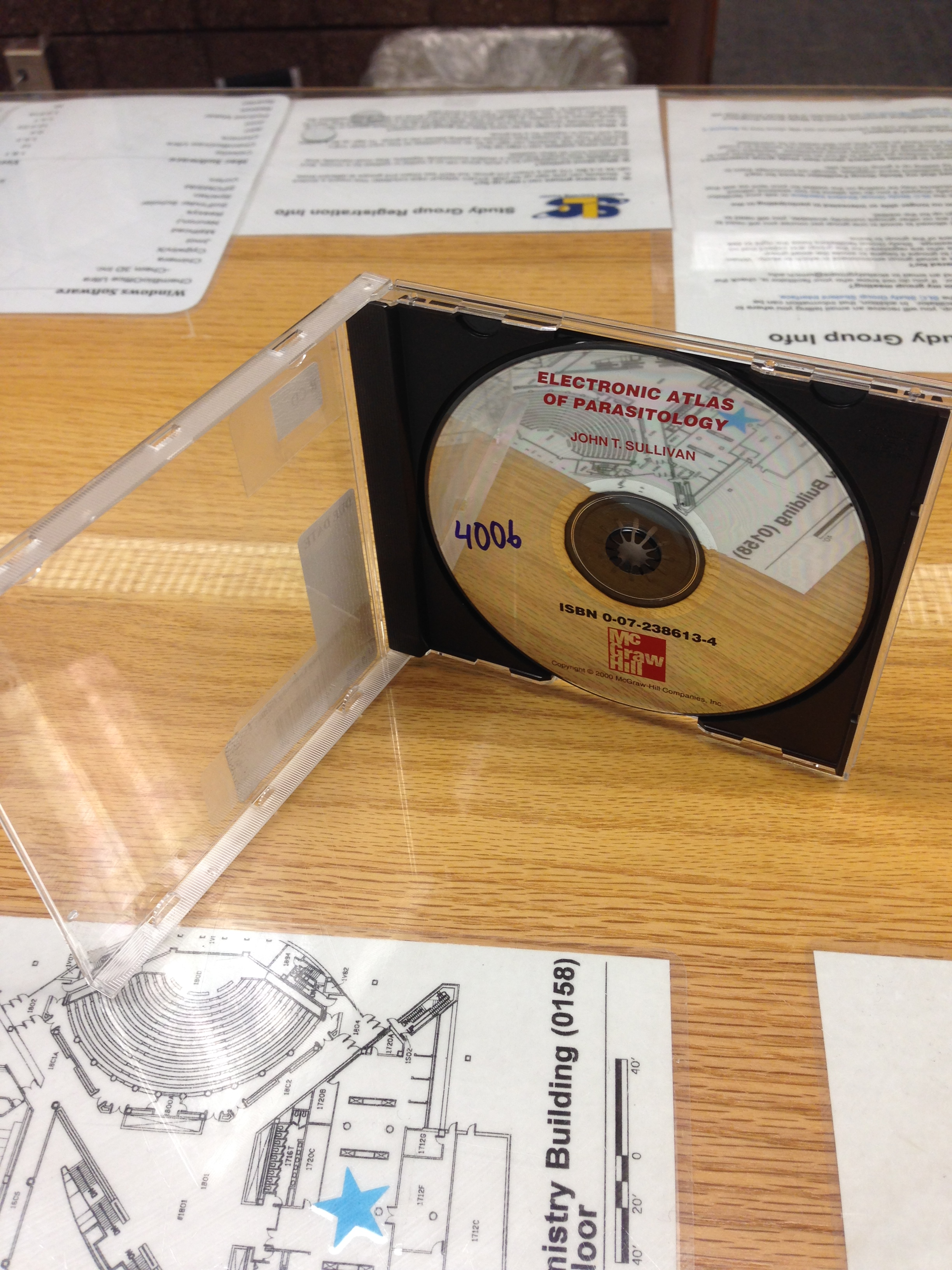
CD case made from general purpose polystyrene (GPPS) and high impact polystyrene in the black portion (HIPS)

High impact polystyrene (HIPS) was discovered by Charles F. Fryling in 1961. HIPS is a low cost, plastic material that is easy to fabricate and often used for low strength structural applications when impact resistance, machinability, and low cost are required. Its major applications include machined prototypes, low-strength structural components, housings, and covers. In order to produce the graft polymer, polybutadiene (rubber) or any similar elastomeric polymer is dissolved in styrene and polymerized. This reaction allows for two simultaneous polymerizations, that of styrene to polystyrene and that of the graft polymerization of styrene-rubber. During commercial use, it can be prepared by graft copolymerization with additional polymer to give the product specific characteristics. The advantages of HIPS includes:

- FDA compliant
- Good impact resistance
- Excellent machinability
- Good dimensional stability
- Easy to paint and glue
- Low cost
- Excellent aesthetic qualities

=== New properties as a result of grafting ===
By grafting polymers onto polymer backbones, the final grafted copolymers gain new properties from their parent polymers. Specifically, cellulose graft copolymers have various different applications that are dependent on the structure of the polymer grafted onto the cellulose. Some of the new properties that cellulose gains from different monomers grafted onto it include:

- Absorption of water
- Improved elasticity
- Hydrophilic/Hydrophobic character
- Ion-exchange
- Dye adsorption capabilities
- Heat Resistance
- Thermosensitivity
- pH sensitivity
- Antibacterial effect

These properties give new application to the ungrafted cellulose polymers that include:

- Medical body fluid absorbent materials
- Enhanced moisture absorbing ability in fabrics
- Permselective membranes
- Stronger nucleating properties than ungrafted cellulose, and adsorption of hazardous contaminants like heavy metal ions or dyes from aqueous solutions by temperature swing adsorption
- Sensors and optical materials
- Reducing agents for various carbonyl compounds
