= Degenerative chain transfer =

IUPAC definition for degenerative chain transfer (also called degenerate chain transfer)

Chain-transfer reaction that generates a new chain carrier and a new chain-transfer agent with the same reactivity as the original chain carrier and chain-transfer agent.

In polymer chemistry, degenerative chain transfer (also called degenerate chain transfer) is a process that can occur in a radical polymerization where the active site is transferred from one site along the polymer chain to another site, without changing the active site's reactivity (hence the term "degenerate," signifying that the pre- and post-transfer active sites have the same energy or reactivity). Thus, the prevalence of degenerative chain transfer in relation to other chain transfer mechanisms has a significant influence on the molecular weight distribution of the resulting product.

In chain polymerization processes it is observed that during the chemical reactions an active centre on a growing chain is transferred from a growing macromolecule - P• - or oligomer to another molecule (transfer agent XR) or to another site on the same molecule.

P• + XR → PX + R•

This transfer involves termination of the initially growing chain to the completed macromolecule PX, where X denotes one end-group of the macromolecule. The example shows that the growing macromolecule as well as the transfer agent are consumed during this process. However, there are also chain transfer reactions that generate new chain carriers and new chain transfer agents at the same time with significant consequences for the distribution of the (average) molecular weight distribution, the dispersity Đ and the (average) degree of polymerization of the product. These chain transfer reactions are called degenerative chain transfer reactions and are observed, for example in RAFT-, ITRP-, or TERP- processes. RAFT = reversible addition-fragmentation chain transfer polymerization; ITRP = iodine-transfer polymerization; TERP = telluride-mediated polymerization. These polymerization techniques belong to the class of reversible deactivation radical polymerizations (RDRP) that show some characteristics of a living polymerization, however, they must not be addressed as living polymerizations because true living polymerizations are characterized by the absence of any termination reaction.

In this sense, a chain-transfer agent RX is a substance that is able to react with a chain carrier by a reaction in which the original chain P• is deactivated and a new chain carrier R• is generated, as shown above.
