= Copolymer =

Polymer derived from more than one species of monomer

Different types of polymers: 1) homopolymer 2) alternating copolymer 3) random copolymer 4) block copolymer 5) graft copolymer.

In polymer chemistry, a copolymer is a polymer derived from more than one species of monomer. The polymerization of monomers into copolymers is called copolymerization. Copolymers obtained from the copolymerization of two monomer species are sometimes called bipolymers. Those obtained from three and four monomers are called terpolymers and quaterpolymers, respectively. Copolymers can be characterized by a variety of techniques such as NMR spectroscopy and size-exclusion chromatography to determine the molecular size, weight, properties, and composition of the material.

Commercial copolymers include acrylonitrile butadiene styrene (ABS), styrene/butadiene co-polymer (SBR), nitrile rubber, styrene-acrylonitrile, styrene-isoprene-styrene (SIS) and ethylene-vinyl acetate, all of which are formed by chain-growth polymerization. Another production mechanism is step-growth polymerization, which is used to produce the nylon-12/6/66 copolymer of nylon 12, nylon 6 and nylon 66, as well as the copolyester family. Copolymers can be used to develop commercial goods or drug delivery vehicles.

IUPAC definition

copolymer: A polymer derived from more than one species of monomer. (See Gold Book entry for note.)

Since a copolymer consists of at least two types of constituent units (also structural units), copolymers can be classified based on how these units are arranged along the chain. Linear copolymers consist of a single main chain and include alternating copolymers, statistical copolymers, and block copolymers. Branched copolymers consist of a single main chain with one or more polymeric side chains, and can be grafted, star shaped, or have other architectures.

== Reactivity ratios ==
The reactivity ratio of a growing copolymer chain terminating in a given monomer is the ratio of the reaction rate constant for addition of the same monomer and the rate constant for addition of the other monomer. That is, $r_1 = \frac{k_{11}}{k_{12}}$ and $r_2 = \frac{k_{22}}{k_{21}}$, where for example $k_{12}$ is the rate constant for propagation of a polymer chain ending in monomer 1 (or A) by addition of monomer 2 (or B).

The composition and structural type of the copolymer depend on these reactivity ratios r_{1} and r_{2} according to the Mayo–Lewis equation, also called the copolymerization equation or copolymer equation, for the relative instantaneous rates of incorporation of the two monomers.

$\frac{\mathrm{d} \left[ \mathrm{M}_1 \right]}{\mathrm{d} \left[ \mathrm{M}_2 \right]} = \frac{\left[ \mathrm{M}_1 \right] \left( r_1 \left[ \mathrm{M}_1 \right] + \left[ \mathrm{M}_2 \right] \right)}{\left[ \mathrm{M}_2 \right] \left( \left[ \mathrm{M}_1 \right] + r_2 \left[ \mathrm{M}_2 \right] \right)}$

== Standardized Nomenclature ==
=== Linear copolymers ===
Due to the wide variety of copolymers possible, there is no single accepted naming convention, but IUPAC has a general suggested naming scheme that indicates the organization of repeat units within a copolymers. In this convention, source based nomenclature is used to indicate the monomers from which the copolymer was synthesized. Following the IUPAC naming conventions, a generally copolymer is named poly(A-co-B), where A and B are the monomers and -co- represents the type of copolymer. This linkers changes with the type of copolymers, examples of which are shown below. If the exact structure of the polymer is unknown, the linker -co- should be used.

Type of Copolymer	Linker	Examples
General or unknown	-co-	poly(A-co-B)
Block copolymer	-block-	polyA-block-polyB
Alternating copolymer	-alt-	poly(A-alt-B)
Periodic copolymer	-per-	poly(A-per-B-per-C)
Statistical copolymer	-stat-	poly(A-stat-B)
Random copolymer	-ran-	poly(A-ran-B)

=== Branched or cross-linked copolymers ===
For nonlinear or branched copolymers, a prefix indicating the type of non-linearity is added prior to the copolymer naming. Given the wide range of potential branched polymers, if the branching pattern is unknown, the general prefix branch is used. Examples of other prefixes are shown below.

Type of Branched cpolymer	Prefix	Examples
Branched, unknown	branch	branch-poly(A-co-B)
Cyclic	cyclo	cyclo-poly(A-co-B)
Short-chain-branched	sh-branch	sh-branch-poly(A-co-B)
Long-chain-branched	l-branch	l-branch-poly(A-co-B)
Comb(like)	comb	comb-poly(A-co-B)
Star	star	star-poly(A-co-B)
Star with f arms	f-star	4-star-poly(A-co-B)
Network, crosslinked	net	net-poly(A-co-B)
Micronetwork	μ-net	μ-net-poly(A-co-B)
Polymer blend	blend	blend-poly(A-co-B)
Interpenetrating polymer network	ipn	ipn-poly(A-co-B)
Polymer-polymer complex	compl	compl-poly(A-co-B)

== Linear copolymers ==
=== Block copolymers ===
Block copolymers comprise two or more homopolymer subunits linked by covalent bonds. The union of the homopolymer subunits may require an intermediate non-repeating subunit, known as a junction block. Diblock copolymers have two distinct blocks; triblock copolymers have three. Technically, a block is a portion of a macromolecule, comprising many units, that has at least one feature which is not present in the adjacent portions. A possible sequence of repeat units A and B in a triblock copolymer might be ~A-A-A-A-A-A-A-B-B-B-B-B-B-B-A-A-A-A-A~.

IUPAC definition

block copolymer: A copolymer that is a block polymer. In the constituent macromolecules of a block copolymer, adjacent blocks are constitutionally different, i.e. adjacent blocks comprise constitutional unit derived from different species of monomer or from the same species of monomer but with a different composition or sequence distribution of constitutional units.

Block copolymers are made up of blocks of different polymerized monomers. For example, polystyrene-b-poly(methyl methacrylate) or PS-b-PMMA (where b = block) is usually made by first polymerizing styrene, and then subsequently polymerizing methyl methacrylate (MMA) from the reactive end of the polystyrene chains. This polymer is a "diblock copolymer" because it contains two different chemical blocks. Triblocks, tetrablocks, multiblocks, etc. can also be made. Diblock copolymers are made using living polymerization techniques, such as atom transfer free radical polymerization (ATRP), reversible addition fragmentation chain transfer (RAFT), ring-opening metathesis polymerization (ROMP), and living cationic or living anionic polymerizations. An emerging technique is chain shuttling polymerization.

The synthesis of block copolymers requires that both reactivity ratios are much larger than unity (r_{1} >> 1, r_{2} >> 1) under the reaction conditions, so that the terminal monomer unit of a growing chain tends to add a similar unit most of the time.

The "blockiness" of a copolymer is a measure of the adjacency of comonomers vs their statistical distribution. Many or even most synthetic polymers are in fact copolymers, containing about 1-20% of a minority monomer. In such cases, blockiness is undesirable. A block index has been proposed as a quantitative measure of blockiness or deviation from random monomer composition.

=== Alternating copolymers ===
IUPAC definition

alternating copolymer: A copolymer consisting of macromolecule comprising two species of monomeric unit in alternating sequence. (See Gold Book entry for note.)

An alternating copolymer has regular alternating A and B units, and is often described by the formula: -A-B-A-B-A-B-A-B-A-B-, or -(-A-B-)_{n}-. The molar ratio of each monomer in the polymer is normally close to one, which happens when the reactivity ratios r_{1} and r_{2} are close to zero, as can be seen from the Mayo–Lewis equation. For example, in the free-radical copolymerization of styrene maleic anhydride copolymer, r_{1} = 0.097 and r_{2} = 0.001, so that most chains ending in styrene add a maleic anhydride unit, and almost all chains ending in maleic anhydride add a styrene unit. This leads to a predominantly alternating structure.

A step-growth copolymer -(-A-A-B-B-)_{n}- formed by the condensation of two bifunctional monomers A–A and B–B is in principle a perfectly alternating copolymer of these two monomers, but is usually considered as a homopolymer of the dimeric repeat unit A-A-B-B. An example is nylon 66 with repeat unit -OC-( CH_{2})_{4}-CO-NH-(CH_{2})_{6}-NH-, formed from a dicarboxylic acid monomer and a diamine monomer.

=== Periodic copolymers ===
Periodic copolymers have units arranged in a repeating sequence. For two monomers A and B, for example, they might form the repeated pattern (A-B-A-B-B-A-A-A-A-B-B-B)_{n}.

=== Statistical copolymers ===
IUPAC definition

statistical copolymer: A copolymer consisting of macromolecule in which the sequential distribution of the monomeric unit obeys known statistical laws. (See Gold Book entry for note.)

In statistical copolymers the sequence of monomer residues follows a statistical rule. If the probability of finding a given type monomer residue at a particular point in the chain is equal to the mole fraction of that monomer residue in the chain, then the polymer may be referred to as a truly random copolymer (structure 3).

Statistical copolymers are dictated by the reaction kinetics of the two chemically distinct monomer reactants, and are commonly referred to interchangeably as "random" in the polymer literature. As with other types of copolymers, random copolymers can have interesting and commercially desirable properties that blend those of the individual homopolymers. Examples of commercially relevant random copolymers include rubbers made from styrene-butadiene copolymers and resins from styrene-acrylic or methacrylic acid derivatives. Copolymerization is particularly useful in tuning the glass transition temperature, which is important in the operating conditions of polymers; it is assumed that each monomer occupies the same amount of free volume whether it is in a copolymer or homopolymer, so the glass transition temperature (T_{g}) falls between the values for each homopolymer and is dictated by the mole or mass fraction of each component.

A number of parameters are relevant in the composition of the polymer product; namely, one must consider the reactivity ratio of each component. Reactivity ratios describe whether the monomer reacts preferentially with a segment of the same type or of the other type. For example, a reactivity ratio that is less than one for component 1 indicates that this component reacts with the other type of monomer more readily. Given this information, which is available for a multitude of monomer combinations in the "Wiley Database of Polymer Properties", the Mayo-Lewis equation can be used to predict the composition of the polymer product for all initial mole fractions of monomer. This equation is derived using the Markov model, which only considers the last segment added as affecting the kinetics of the next addition; the Penultimate Model considers the second-to-last segment as well, but is more complicated than is required for most systems. When both reactivity ratios are less than one, there is an azeotropic point in the Mayo-Lewis plot. At this point, the mole fraction of monomer equals the composition of the component in the polymer.

There are several ways to synthesize random copolymers. The most common synthesis method is free radical polymerization; this is especially useful when the desired properties rely on the composition of the copolymer rather than the molecular weight, since free radical polymerization produces relatively disperse polymer chains. Free radical polymerization is less expensive than other methods, and produces high-molecular weight polymer quickly. Several methods offer better control over dispersity. Anionic polymerization can be used to create random copolymers, but with several caveats: if carbanions of the two components do not have the same stability, only one of the species will add to the other. Additionally, anionic polymerization is expensive and requires very clean reaction conditions, and is therefore difficult to implement on a large scale. Less disperse random copolymers are also synthesized by ″living″ controlled radical polymerization methods, such as atom-transfer radical-polymerization (ATRP), nitroxide mediated radical polymerization (NMP), or reversible addition−fragmentation chain-transfer polymerization (RAFT). These methods are favored over anionic polymerization because they can be performed in conditions similar to free radical polymerization. The reactions require longer experimentation periods than free radical polymerization, but still achieve reasonable reaction rates.

=== Stereoblock copolymers ===
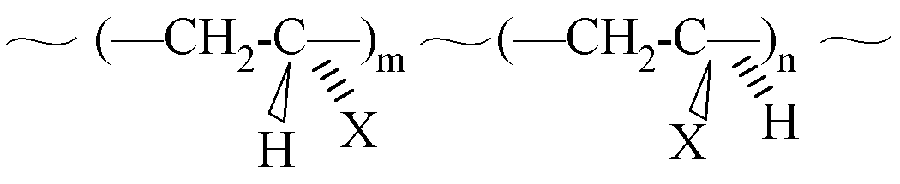
A stereoblock vinyl copolymer

In stereoblock copolymers the blocks or units differ only in the tacticity of the monomers.

=== Gradient copolymers ===
In gradient copolymers the monomer composition changes gradually along the chain.

== Branched copolymers ==
There are a variety of architectures possible for nonlinear copolymers. Beyond grafted and star polymers discussed below, other common types of branched copolymers include brush copolymers and comb copolymers.

=== Graft copolymers ===
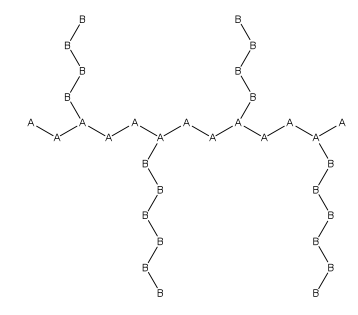
The graft copolymer consists of a main polymer chain or backbone (A) covalently bonded to one or more side chains (B)

Graft copolymers are a special type of branched copolymer wherein the side chains are structurally distinct from the main chain. Typically, the main chain is formed from one type of monomer (A) and branches are formed from another monomer (B), or the side-chains have constitutional or configurational features that differ from those in the main chain.

The individual chains of a graft copolymer may be homopolymers or copolymers. Note that different copolymer sequencing is sufficient to define a structural difference, thus an A-B diblock copolymer with A-B alternating copolymer side chains is properly called a graft copolymer.

For example, polystyrene chains may be grafted onto polybutadiene, a synthetic rubber which retains one reactive C=C double bond per repeat unit. The polybutadiene is dissolved in styrene, which is then subjected to free-radical polymerization. The growing chains can add across the double bonds of rubber molecules forming polystyrene branches. The graft copolymer is formed in a mixture with ungrafted polystyrene chains and rubber molecules.

As with block copolymers, the quasi-composite product has properties of both "components." In the example cited, the rubbery chains absorb energy when the substance is hit, so it is much less brittle than ordinary polystyrene. The product is called high-impact polystyrene, or HIPS.

=== Star copolymers ===
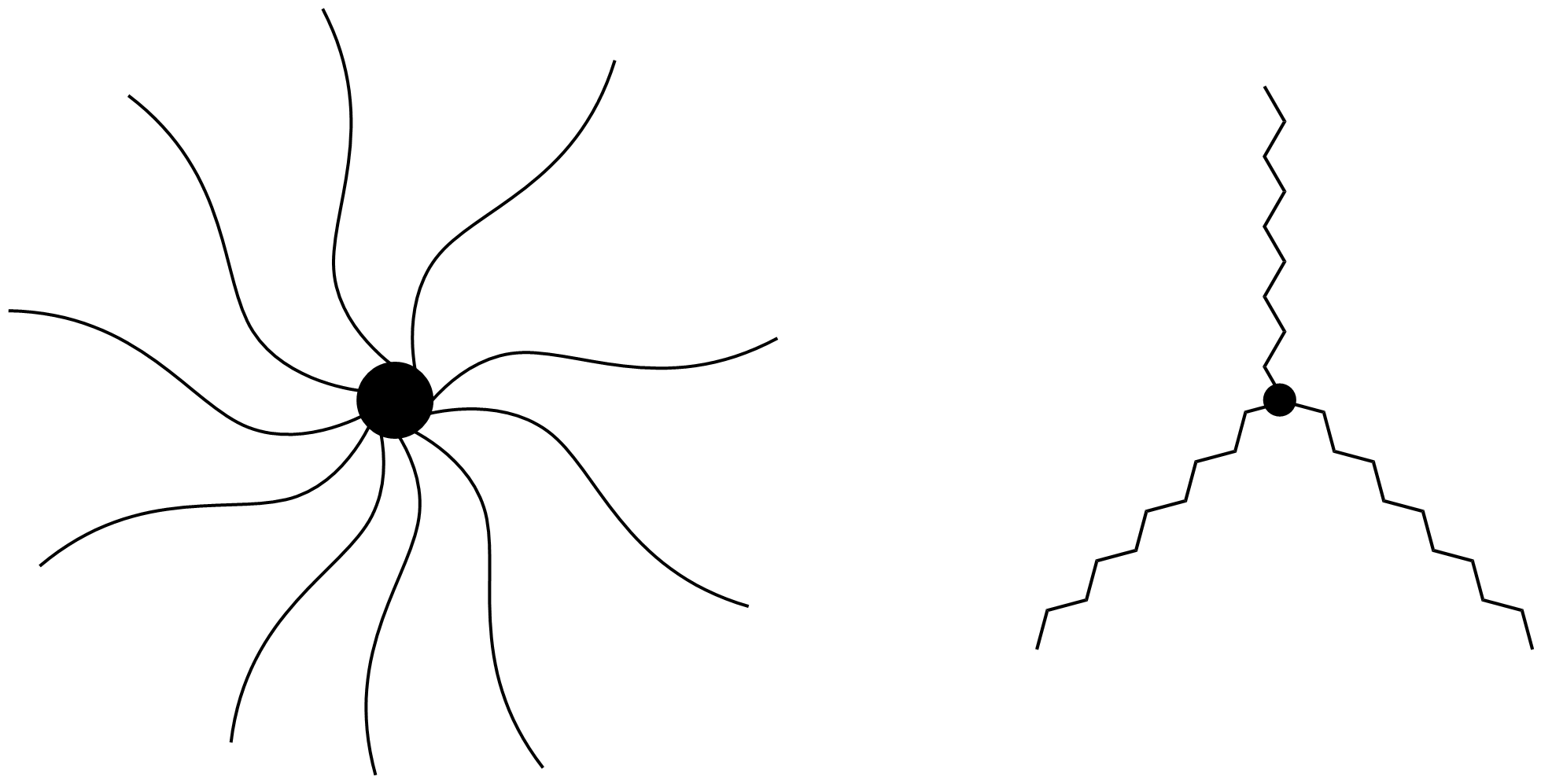
Star shaped polymers or copolymers

Star (co)polymers are branched (co)polymers in which several polymer chains are connected to a central core.

== Microphase separation ==
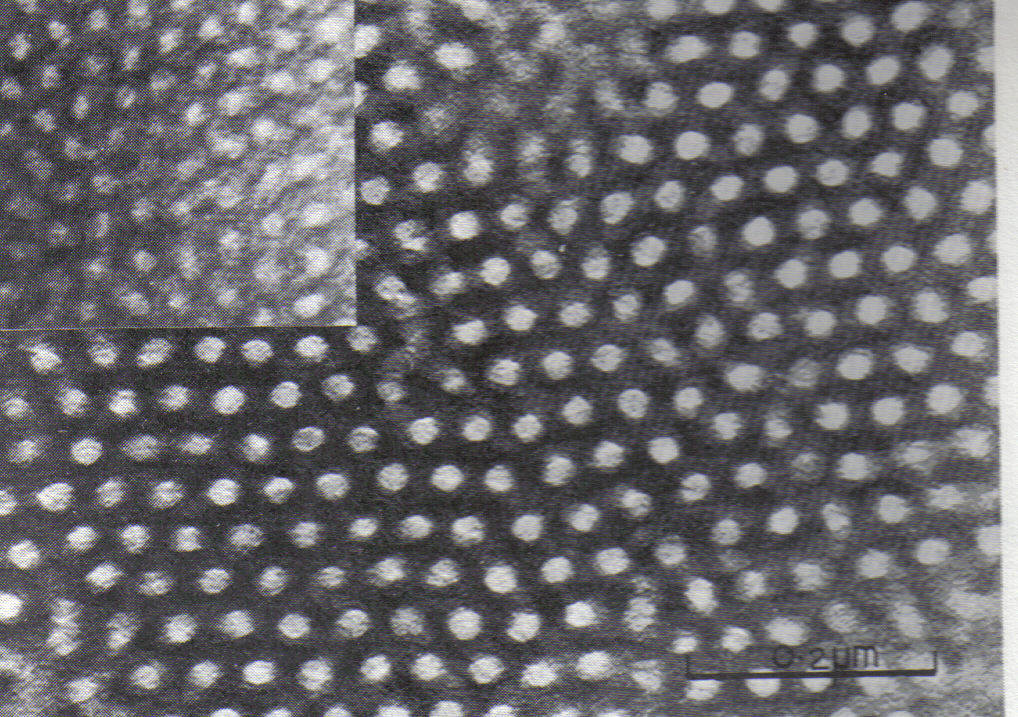
SBS block copolymer in TEM

Block copolymers can "microphase separate" to form periodic nanostructures, such as styrene-butadiene-styrene block copolymer. The polymer is known as Kraton and is used for shoe soles and adhesives. Owing to the microfine structure, transmission electron microscope or TEM was used to examine the structure. The butadiene matrix was stained with osmium tetroxide to provide contrast in the image. The material was made by living polymerization so that the blocks are almost monodisperse to create a regular microstructure. The molecular weight of the polystyrene blocks in the main picture is 102,000; the inset picture has a molecular weight of 91,000, producing slightly smaller domains.

SBS block copolymer schematic microstructure

Microphase separation is a situation similar to that of oil and water. Oil and water are immiscible (i.e., they can phase separate). Due to the incompatibility between the blocks, block copolymers undergo a similar phase separation. Since the blocks are covalently bonded to each other, they cannot demix macroscopically like water and oil. In "microphase separation," the blocks form nanometer-sized structures. Depending on the relative lengths of each block, several morphologies can be obtained. In diblock copolymers, sufficiently different block lengths lead to nanometer-sized spheres of one block in a matrix of the second (e.g., PMMA in polystyrene). Using less different block lengths, a "hexagonally packed cylinder" geometry can be obtained. Blocks of similar length form layers (often called lamellae in the technical literature). Between the cylindrical and lamellar phase is the gyroid phase. The nanoscale structures created from block copolymers can potentially be used to create devices for computer memory, nanoscale-templating, and nanoscale separations. Block copolymers are sometimes used as a replacement for phospholipids in model lipid bilayers and liposomes for their superior stability and tunability.

Polymer scientists use thermodynamics to describe how the different blocks interact. The product of the degree of polymerization, n, and the Flory-Huggins interaction parameter, $\chi$, gives an indication of how incompatible the two blocks are and whether they will microphase separate. For example, a diblock copolymer of symmetric composition will microphase separate if the product $\chi N$ is greater than 10.5. If $\chi N$ is less than 10.5, the blocks will mix and microphase separation is not observed. The incompatibility between the blocks also affects the solution behavior of these copolymers and their adsorption behavior on various surfaces.

Block copolymers are able to self-assemble in selective solvents to form micelles among other structures.

In thin films, block copolymers are of great interest as masks in the lithographic patterning of semiconductor materials for applications in high density data storage. A key challenge is to minimise the feature size and much research is in progress on this.

== Characterization ==
Characterization techniques for copolymers are similar to those for other polymeric materials. These techniques can be used to determine the average molecular weight, molecular size, chemical composition, molecular homogeneity, and physiochemical properties of the material. However, given that copolymers are made of base polymer components with heterogeneous properties, this may require multiple characterization techniques to accurately characterize these copolymers.

Spectroscopic techniques, such as nuclear magnetic resonance spectroscopy (NMR), infrared spectroscopy (IR), and UV spectroscopy, are often used to identify the molecular structure and chemical composition of copolymers. NMR can be used to determine a number of polymer characteristics, including tacticity and repeat unit sequence, predominantly using ^{1}H and ^{13}C NMR. NMR can also be used for analysis of the end groups and branching points within polymer chains, which can provide information both about size and branching pattern. IR spectroscopy is primarily used to identify functional groups attached to a copolymer, but it can also provide information about the degree of branching within a copolymer. UV spectroscopy can be used to determine the concentration of a chromophore-containing monomer within a polymer resin. UV spectroscopy is commonly used as a detector with size-exclusion chromatography.

Scattering techniques, such as static light scattering, dynamic light scattering, and small-angle neutron scattering, can determine the molecular size and weight of the synthesized copolymer. Static light scattering and dynamic light scattering use light to determine the average molecular weight and behavior of the copolymer in solution whereas small-angle neutron scattering uses neutrons to determine the molecular weight and chain length. Additionally, x-ray scattering techniques, such as small-angle X-ray scattering (SAXS) can help determine the nanometer morphology and characteristic feature size of a microphase-separated block-copolymer or suspended micelles.

Differential scanning calorimetry is a thermoanalytical technique used to determine the thermal events of the copolymer as a function of temperature. It can indicate when the copolymer is undergoing a phase transition, such as crystallization or melting, by measuring the heat flow required to maintain the material and a reference at a constantly increasing temperature.

Thermogravimetric analysis is another thermoanalytical technique used to access the thermal stability of the copolymer as a function of temperature. This provides information on any changes to the physicochemical properties, such as phase transitions, thermal decompositions, and redox reactions.

Size-exclusion chromatography can separate copolymers with different molecular weights based on their hydrodynamic volume. From there, the molecular weight can be determined by deriving the relationship from its hydrodynamic volume. Larger copolymers tend to elute first as they do not interact with the column as much. The collected material is commonly detected by light scattering methods, a refractometer, or a viscometer to determine the concentration of the eluted copolymer.

== Applications ==
=== Block copolymers ===
A common application of block copolymers is to develop thermoplastic elastomers (TPEs). Early commercial TPEs were developed from polyurethranes (TPUs), consisting of alternating soft segments and hard segments, and are used in automotive bumpers and snowmobile treads. Styrenic TPEs entered the market later, and are used in footwear, bitumen modification, thermoplastic blending, adhesives, and cable insulation and gaskets. Modifying the linkages between the blocks resulted in newer TPEs based on polyesters (TPES) and polyamides (TPAs), used in hose tubing, sport goods, and automotive components.

Amphiphilic block copolymers have the ability to form micelles and nanoparticles. Due to this property, amphiphilic block copolymers have garnered much attention in research on vehicles for drug delivery. Similarly, amphiphilic block copolymers can be used for the removal of organic contaminants from water either through micelle formation or film preparation.

=== Alternating copolymers ===
The styrene-maleic acid (SMA) alternating copolymer displays amphiphilicity depending on pH, allowing it to change conformations in different environments. Some conformations that SMA can take are random coil formation, compact globular formation, micelles, and nanodiscs. SMA has been used as a dispersing agent for dyes and inks, as drug delivery vehicles, and for membrane solubilization.

=== Copolymer engineering ===
Copolymerization is used to modify the properties of manufactured plastics to meet specific needs, for example to reduce crystallinity, modify glass transition temperature, control wetting properties or to improve solubility. It is a way of improving mechanical properties, in a technique known as rubber toughening. Elastomeric phases within a rigid matrix act as crack arrestors, and so increase the energy absorption when the material is impacted for example. Acrylonitrile butadiene styrene is a common example.

== See also ==
- Copolymers section of Polymer article
- Thermoplastic elastomer
- Tholin
