= 4,4'-Azobis(4-cyanopentanoic acid) =

4,4′-Azobis(4-cyanopentanoic acid)

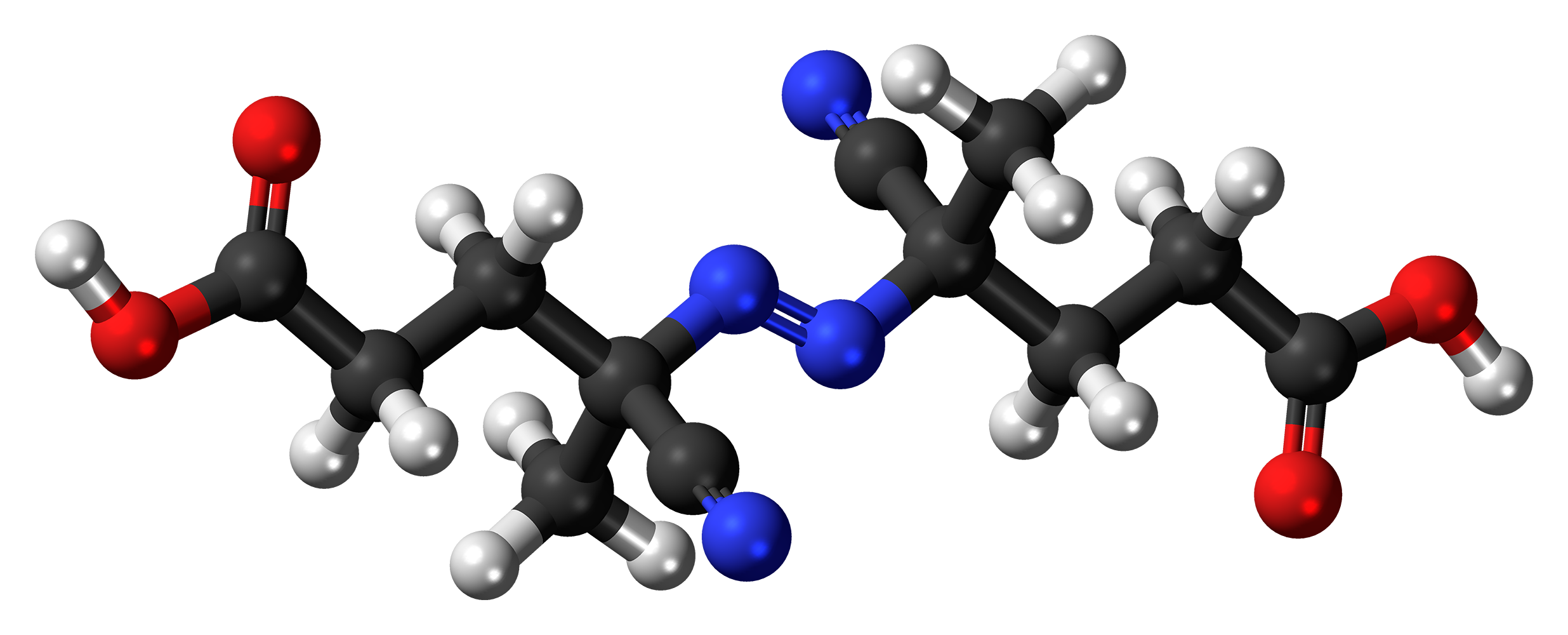

Names
- Preferred IUPAC name 4,4′-[(E)-Diazenediyl]bis(4-cyanopentanoic acid)
- Other names 4,4-Azobis(4-cyanovaleric acid); 4,4-Azobis(cyanovaleric acid); 4,4′-Azobis(4-cyanopentanoic acid); ABCVA; ACVA

Identifiers
CAS Number	2638-94-0
3D model (JSmol)	Interactive image
ChemSpider	83896
ECHA InfoCard	100.018.305
PubChem CID	92938
CompTox Dashboard (EPA)	DTXSID3044629
- InChI: InChI=1S/C12H16N4O4/c1-11(7-13,5-3-9(17)18)15-16-12(2,8-14)6-4-10(19)20/h3-6H2,1-2H3,(H,17,18)(H,19,20)/b16-15+ Key: VFXXTYGQYWRHJP-FOCLMDBBSA-N
- SMILES: CC(CCC(=O)O)(C#N)N=NC(C)(CCC(=O)O)C#N

Properties
Chemical formula	C_{12}H_{16}N_{4}O_{4}
Molar mass	280.284 g·mol^{−1}
Appearance	White crystalline powder
Melting point	118 to 125 °C (244 to 257 °F; 391 to 398 K)
Solubility in water	Soluble
- Except where otherwise noted, data are given for materials in their standard state (at 25 °C [77 °F], 100 kPa). verify (what is ?) Infobox references

4,4′-Azobis(4-cyanopentanoic acid) (ACPA) is a free radical initiator used in polymer synthesis. ACPA is a water-soluble initiator used in both heterogeneous and homogeneous free-radical polymerizations. It is used as an initiator in reversible addition−fragmentation chain transfer polymerization (RAFT). When heated to decomposition, c. 70 °C, it releases N_{2} and produces 2 equivalents of reactive radicals capable of initiating polymerization.
