= Living free-radical polymerization =

IUPAC definition for
reversible-deactivation radical polymerization

Chain polymerization, propagated by radicals that are deactivated reversibly, bringing them into active/dormant equilibria of which there might be more than one.
See also reversible-deactivation polymerization RDP.

Living free radical polymerization is a type of living polymerization where the active polymer chain end is a free radical. Several methods exist. IUPAC recommends to use the term "reversible-deactivation radical polymerization" instead of "living free radical polymerization", though the two terms are not synonymous.

== Reversible-deactivation polymerization ==
There is a mode of polymerization referred to as reversible-deactivation polymerization which is distinct from living polymerization, despite some common features. Living polymerization requires a complete absence of termination reactions, whereas reversible-deactivation polymerization may contain a similar fraction of termination as conventional polymerization with the same concentration of active species. Some important aspects of these are compared in the table:

Comparison of radical polymerization processes
Property	Standard radical polymerization	Living polymerization	Reversible-deactivation polymerization
Concn. of initiating species	Falls off only slowly	Falls off very rapidly	Falls off very rapidly
Concn. of chain carriers (Number of growing chains)	Instantaneous steady state (Bodenstein approximation applies) decreasing throughout reaction	Constant throughout reaction	Constant throughout reaction
Lifetime of growing chains	~ 10^{−3} s	Same as reaction duration	Same as reaction duration
Main form of termination	Radical combination or radical disproportionation	Termination reactions are precluded	Termination reactions are not precluded
Degree of polymerization	Broad range (Ð ≥ 1.5); Schulz-Zimm distribution	Narrow range (Ð < 1.5); Poisson distribution	Narrow range (Ð < 1.5); Poisson distribution
Dormant states	None	Rare	Predominant

== Catalytic chain transfer and cobalt mediated radical polymerization ==
Catalytic chain transfer polymerization is not a strictly living form of polymerization. Yet it figures significantly in the development of later forms of living free radical polymerization. Discovered in the late 1970s in the USSR it was found that cobalt porphyrins were able to reduce the molecular weight during polymerization of methacrylates. Later investigations showed that the cobalt glyoxime complexes were as effective as the porphyrin catalysts and also less oxygen sensitive. Due to their lower oxygen sensitivity these catalysts have been investigated much more thoroughly than the porphyrin catalysts.

The major products of catalytic chain transfer polymerization are vinyl-terminated polymer chains. One of the major drawbacks of the process is that catalytic chain transfer polymerization does not produce macromonomers but instead produces addition fragmentation agents. When a growing polymer chain reacts with the addition fragmentation agent the radical end-group attacks the vinyl bond and forms a bond. However, the resulting product is so hindered that the species undergoes fragmentation, leading eventually to telechelic species.

These addition fragmentation chain transfer agents do form graft copolymers with styrenic and acrylate species however they do so by first forming block copolymers and then incorporating these block copolymers into the main polymer backbone.

While high yields of macromonomers are possible with methacrylate monomers, low yields are obtained when using catalytic chain transfer agents during the polymerization of acrylate and stryenic monomers. This has been seen to be due to the interaction of the radical centre with the catalyst during these polymerization reactions.

The reversible reaction of the cobalt macrocycle with the growing radical is known as cobalt carbon bonding and in some cases leads to living polymerization reactions.

== Iniferter polymerization ==
An iniferter is a chemical compound that simultaneously acts as initiator, transfer agent, and terminator (hence the name ini-fer-ter) in controlled free radical iniferter polymerizations, the most common is the dithiocarbamate type.

== Stable free radical mediated polymerization ==
The two options of SFRP are nitroxide mediated polymerization (NMP) and verdazyl mediated polymerization (VMP), SFRP was discovered while using a radical scavenger called TEMPO when investigating the rate of initiation during free radical polymerization. When the coupling of the stable free radical with the polymeric radical is sufficiently reversible, termination is reversible, and the propagating radical concentration can be limited to levels that allow controlled polymerization. Similar to atom transfer radical polymerization (discussed below), the equilibrium between dormant chains (those reversibly terminated with the stable free radical) and active chains (those with a radical capable of adding to monomer) is designed to heavily favor the dormant state. Further stable free radicals have also been explored for this polymerization reaction with lower efficiency.

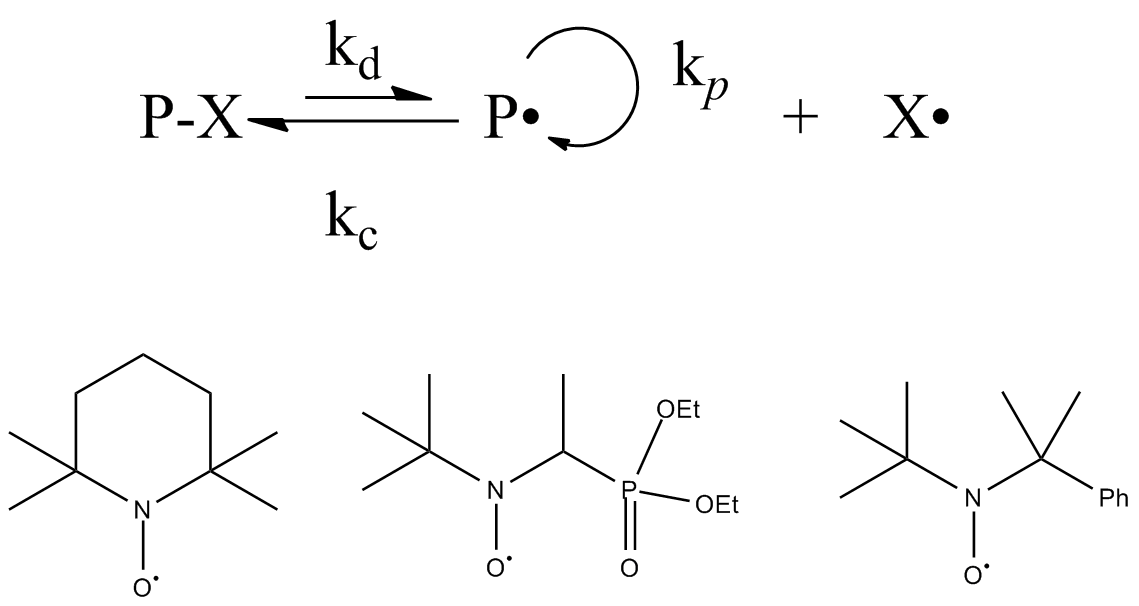

== Atom transfer radical polymerization (ATRP) ==
Among LRP methods, ATRP is the most studied one. Since its development in 1995 an exhaustive number of articles has been published on this topic. A review written by Matyjaszewski covers the developments in ATRP from 1995 to 2000. ATRP involves the chain initiation of free radical polymerization by a halogenated organic species in the presence of a metal halide. The metal has a number of different oxidation states that allows it to abstract a halide from the organohalide, creating a radical that then starts free radical polymerization. After initiation and propagation, the radical on the active chain terminus is reversibly terminated (with the halide) by reacting with the catalyst in its higher oxidation state. Thus, the redox process gives rise to an equilibrium between dormant (polymer-halide) and active (polymer-radical) chains. The equilibrium is designed to heavily favor the dormant state, which effectively reduces the radical concentration to a sufficiently low level to limit bimolecular coupling.

Obstacles associated with this type of reaction is the generally low solubility of the metal halide species, which results in limited availability of the catalyst. This is improved by the addition of a ligand, which significantly improves the solubility of the metal halide and thus the availability of the catalyst but complicates subsequent catalyst removal from the polymer product.

== Reversible addition fragmentation chain transfer (RAFT) polymerization ==
RAFT technology offers the benefit of being able to readily synthesize polymers with predetermined molecular weight and narrow molecular weight distributions over a wide range of monomers with reactive terminal groups that can be purposely manipulated, including further polymerization, with complex architecture.6 Furthermore, RAFT can be used in all modes of free radical polymerization: solution, emulsion and suspension polymerizations. Implementing the RAFT technique can be as simple as introducing a suitable chain transfer agent (CTA), known as a RAFT agent, into a conventional free radical polymerization reaction (must be devoid of oxygen, which terminates propagation). This CTA is the main species in RAFT polymerization. Generally it is a di- or tri-thiocarbonylthio compound (1), which produces the dormant form of the radical chains. Control in RAFT polymerization (scheme 1) is achieved in a far more complicated manner than the homolytic bond formation-bond cleavage of SFRP and ATRP. The CTA for RAFT polymerization must be chosen cautiously because it has an effect on polymer length, chemical composition, rate of the reaction and the number of side reactions that may occur.

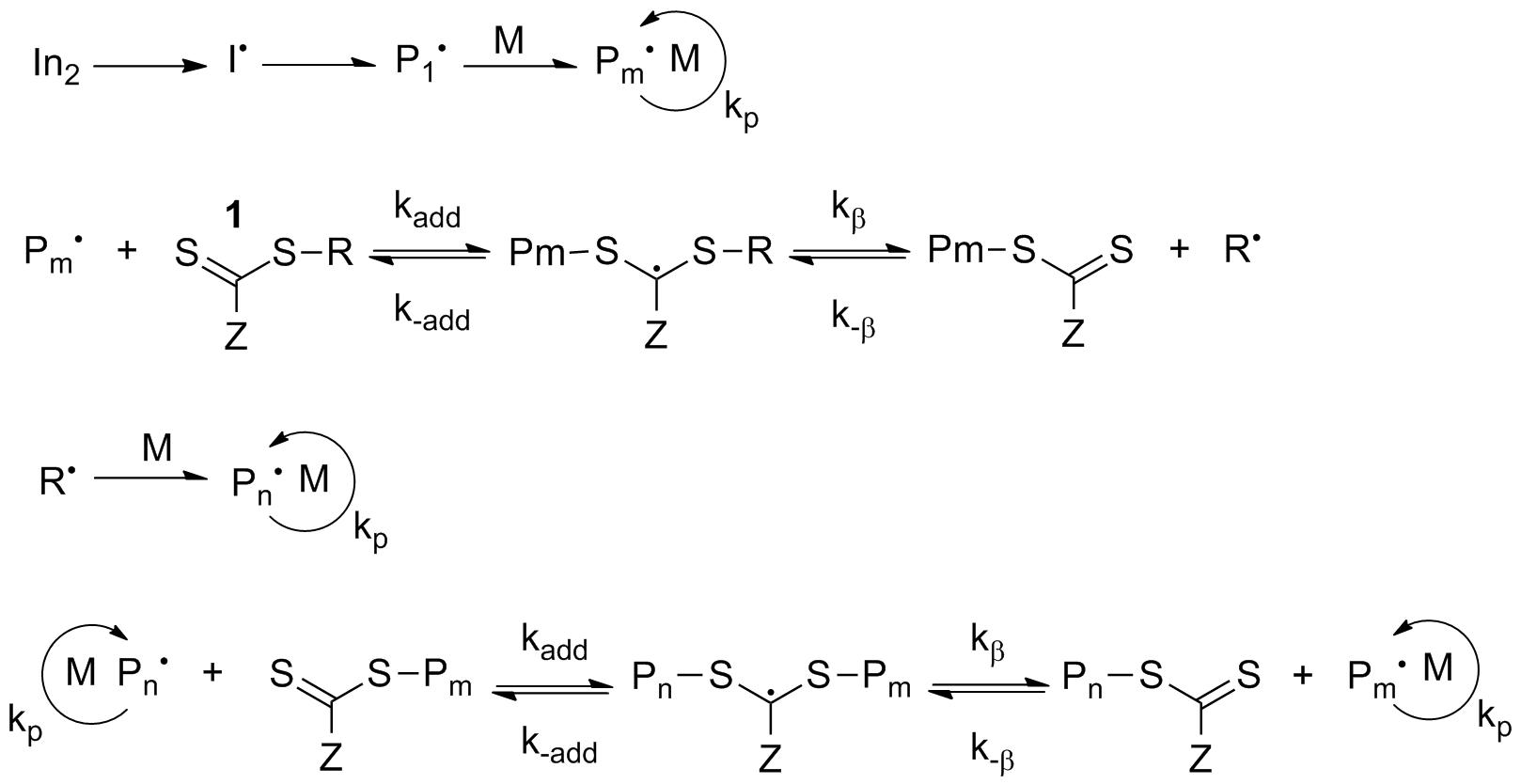

The mechanism of RAFT begins with a standard initiation step as homolytic bond cleavage of the initiator molecule yields a reactive free radical. This free radical then reacts with a molecule of the monomer to form the active center with additional molecules of monomer then adding in a sequential fashion to produce a growing polymer chain (Pn•). The propagating chain adds to the CTA (1) to yield a radical intermediate. Fragmentation of this intermediate gives rise to either the original polymer chain (Pn•) or to a new radical (R•), which itself must be able to reinitiate polymerization. This free radical generates its own active center by reaction with the monomer and eventually a new propagating chain (Pm•) is formed.3 Ultimately, chain equilibration occurs in which there is a rapid equilibrium between the actively growing radicals and the dormant compounds, thereby allowing all of the chains to grow at the same rate. A limited amount of termination does occur; however, the effect of termination of polymerization kinetics is negligible.

The calculation of molecular weight for a synthesized polymer is relatively easy, in spite of the complex mechanism for RAFT polymerization. As stated before, during the equilibration step, all chains are growing at equal rates, or in other words, the molecular weight of the polymer increases linearly with conversion. Multiplying the ratio of monomer consumed to the concentration of the CTA used by the molecular weight of the monomer (mM) a reliable estimate of the number average molecular weight can be determined.

RAFT is a degenerative chain transfer process and is free radical in nature. RAFT agents contain di- or tri-thiocarbonyl groups, and it is the reaction with an initiator, usually AIBN, that creates a propagating chain or polymer radical. This polymer chain then adds to the C=S and leads to the formation of a stabilized radical intermediate. In an ideal system, these stabilized radical intermediates do not undergo termination reactions, but instead reintroduce a radical capable of reinitiation or propagation with monomer, while they themselves reform their C=S bond. The cycle of addition to the C=S bond, followed by fragmentation of a radical, continues until all monomer or initiator is consumed. Termination is limited in this system by the low concentration of active radicals and any termination that does occur is negligible. RAFT, invented by Rizzardo et al. at CSIRO and a mechanistically identical process termed Macromolecular Design via Interchange of Xanthates (MADIX), invented by Zard et al. at Rhodia were both first reported in 1998/early 1999.

== Iodine-transfer polymerization (ITP) ==
Iodine-transfer polymerization (ITP, also called ITRP), developed by Tatemoto and coworkers in the 1970s gives relatively low polydispersities for fluoroolefin polymers. While it has received relatively little academic attention, this chemistry has served as the basis for several industrial patents and products and may be the most commercially successful form of living free radical polymerization. It has primarily been used to incorporate iodine cure sites into fluoroelastomers.

The mechanism of ITP involves thermal decomposition of the radical initiator (AIBN), generating the initiating radical In•. This radical adds to the monomer M to form the species P_{1}•, which can propagate to P_{m}•. By exchange of iodine from the transfer agent R-I to the propagating radical P_{m}• a new radical R• is formed and P_{m}• becomes dormant. This species can propagate with monomer M to P_{n}•. During the polymerization exchange between the different polymer chains and the transfer agent occurs, which is typical for a degenerative transfer process.

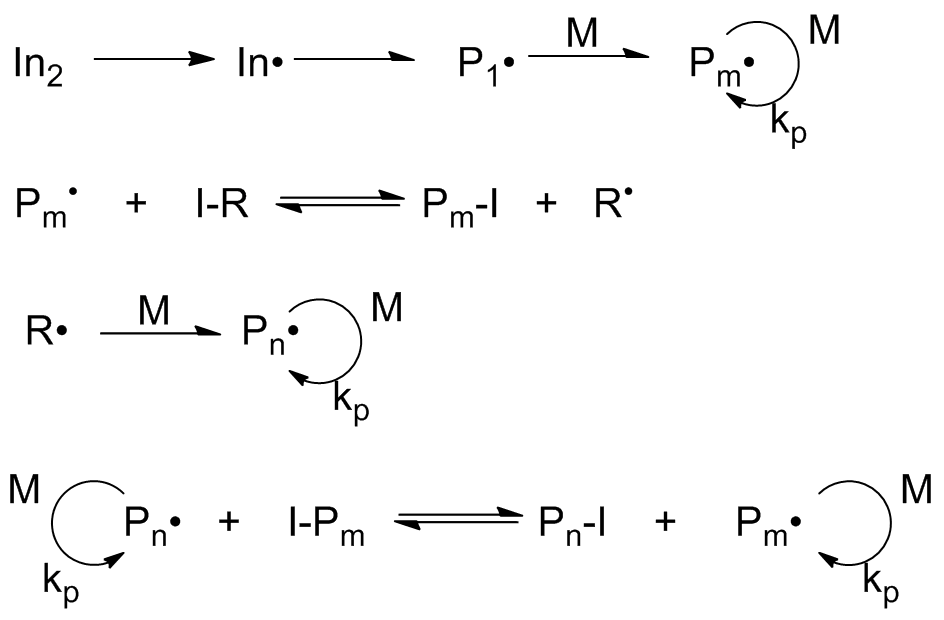

Typically, iodine transfer polymerization uses a mono- or diiodo-perfluoroalkane as the initial chain transfer agent. This fluoroalkane may be partially substituted with hydrogen or chlorine. The energy of the iodine-perfluoroalkane bond is low and, in contrast to iodo-hydrocarbon bonds, its polarization small. Therefore, the iodine is easily abstracted in the presence of free radicals. Upon encountering an iodoperfluoroalkane, a growing poly(fluoroolefin) chain will abstract the iodine and terminate, leaving the now-created perfluoroalkyl radical to add further monomer. But the iodine-terminated poly(fluoroolefin) itself acts as a chain transfer agent. As in RAFT processes, as long as the rate of initiation is kept low, the net result is the formation of a monodisperse molecular weight distribution.

Use of conventional hydrocarbon monomers with iodoperfluoroalkane chain transfer agents has been described. The resulting molecular weight distributions have not been narrow since the energetics of an iodine-hydrocarbon bond are considerably different from that of an iodine-fluorocarbon bond and abstraction of the iodine from the terminated polymer difficult. The use of hydrocarbon iodides has also been described, but again the resulting molecular weight distributions were not narrow.

Preparation of block copolymers by iodine-transfer polymerization was also described by Tatemoto and coworkers in the 1970s.

Although use of living free radical processes in emulsion polymerization has been characterized as difficult, all examples of iodine-transfer polymerization have involved emulsion polymerization. Extremely high molecular weights have been claimed.

Listed below are some other less described but to some extent increasingly important living radical polymerization techniques.

== Selenium-centered radical-mediated polymerization ==
Diphenyl diselenide and several benzylic selenides have been explored by Kwon et al. as photoiniferters in polymerization of styrene and methyl methacrylate. Their mechanism of control over polymerization is proposed to be similar to the dithiuram disulfide iniferters. However, their low transfer constants allow them to be used for block copolymer synthesis but give limited control over the molecular weight distribution.

== Telluride-mediated polymerization (TERP) ==
Telluride-mediated polymerization or TERP first appeared to mainly operate under a reversible chain transfer mechanism by homolytic substitution under thermal initiation. However, in a kinetic study it was found that TERP predominantly proceeds by degenerative transfer rather than 'dissociation combination'.

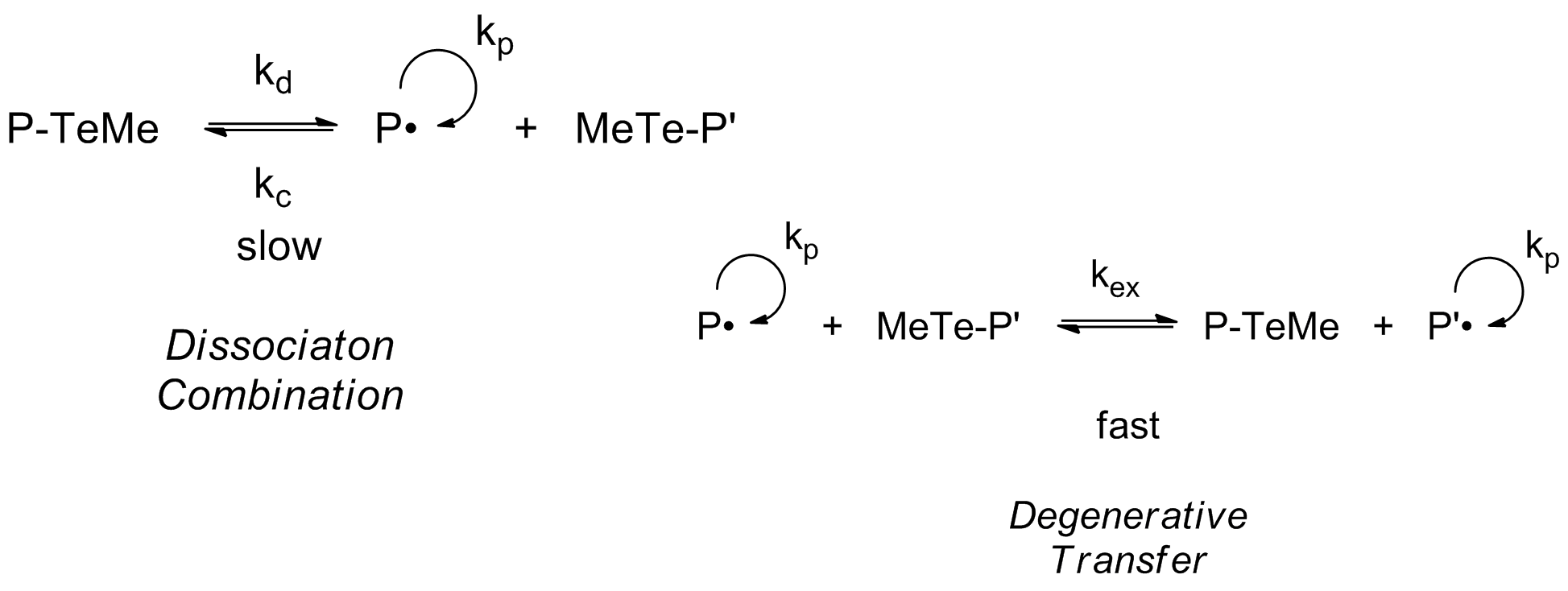

Alkyl tellurides of the structure Z-X-R, were Z=methyl and R= a good free radical leaving group, give the better control for a wide range of monomers, phenyl tellurides (Z=phenyl) giving poor control. Polymerization of methyl methacrylates are only controlled by ditellurides. The importance of X to chain transfer increases in the series O<S<Se<Te, makes alkyl tellurides effective in mediating control under thermally initiated conditions and the alkyl selenides and sulfides effective only under photoinitiated polymerization.

== Stibine-mediated polymerization ==
More recently Yamago et al. reported stibine-mediated polymerization, using an organostibine transfer agent with the general structure Z(Z')-Sb-R (where Z= activating group and R= free radical leaving group). A wide range of monomers (styrenics, (meth)acrylics and vinylics) can be controlled, giving narrow molecular weight distributions and predictable molecular weights under thermally initiated conditions. Yamago has also published a patent indicating that bismuth alkyls can also control radical polymerizations via a similar mechanism.
