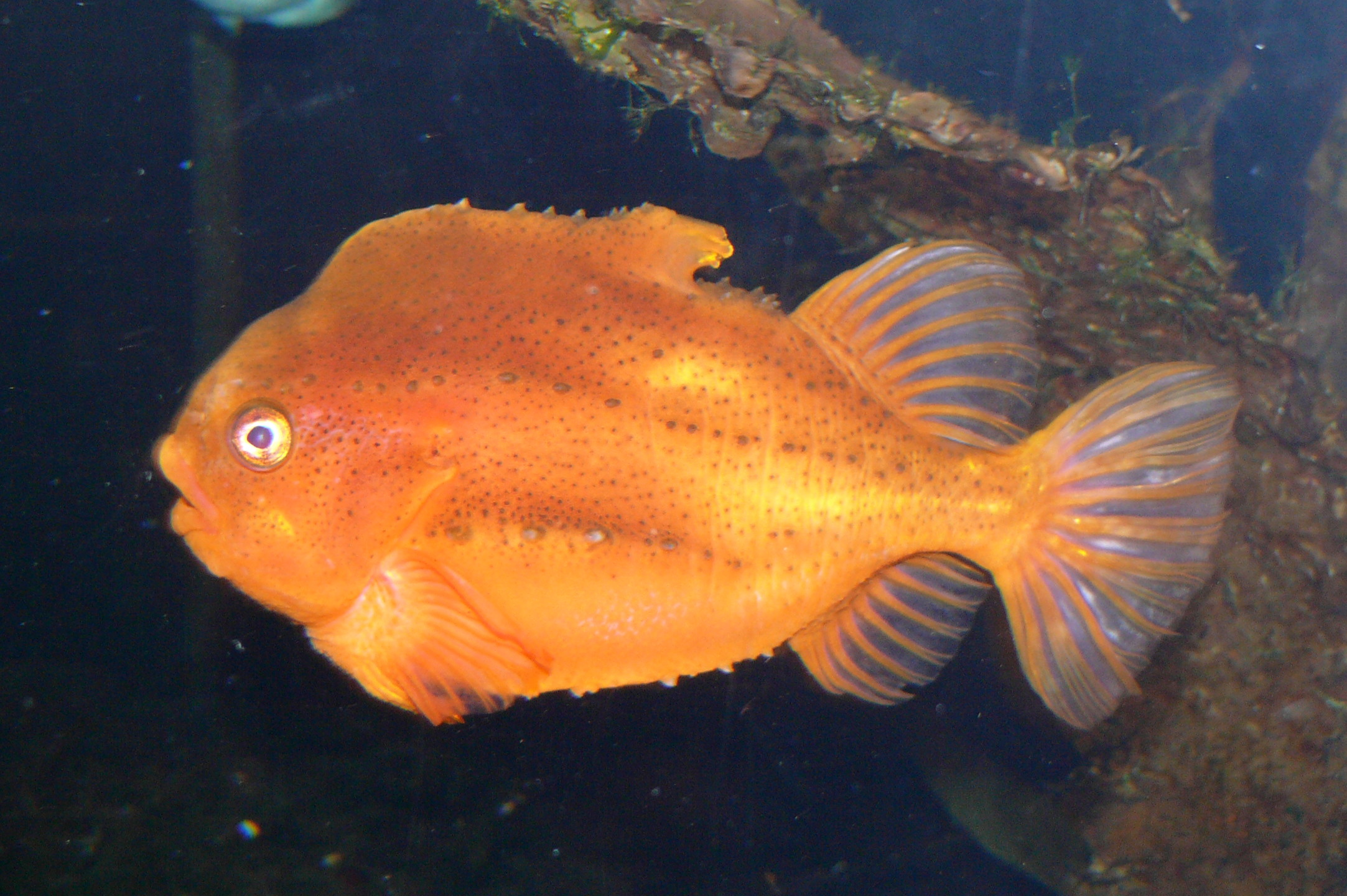
- Cyclopterus lumpus

Scientific classification
- Kingdom: Animalia
- Phylum: Chordata
- Class: Actinopterygii
- Division: Teleostei
- Order: Perciformes
- Suborder: Cottoidei
- Superfamily: Cyclopteroidea
- Family: Cyclopteridae; Bonaparte, 1831

Genera
- see text

= Cyclopteridae =

Lumpsuckers or lumpfishes

Family of fishes

The Cyclopteridae are a family of marine fishes, commonly known as lumpsuckers or lumpfish, in the order Scorpaeniformes. They are found in the cold waters of the Arctic, North Atlantic, and North Pacific oceans. The greatest number of species are found in the North Pacific. The family name Cyclopteridae derives from the Greek words κύκλος (kyklos), meaning "circle" and πτέρυξ (pteryx), meaning "wing" or "fin" in reference to the circle-shaped pectoral fins of most of the fish in this family.

== Genera ==
Cyclopteridae includes the following valid genera:

- Subfamily Cyclopterinae Bonaparte, 1831 (lumpsuckers)
  - Cyclopterus Linnaeus, 1758
- Subfamily Liparopsinae Garman, 1892 (smooth lumpsuckers)
  - Aptocyclus De la Pylaie, 1835
- Subfamily Eumicrotreminae Oku, Imamura & Yabe, 2017 (spiny lumpsuckers)
  - Cyclopsis Popov, 1930
  - Eumicrotremus Gill, 1862 (=Cyclopteropsis Soldatov & Popov, 1929)
  - Lethotremus Gilbert, 1896
  - Proeumicrotremus Voskoboinikova & Orlov, 2020

== Description ==
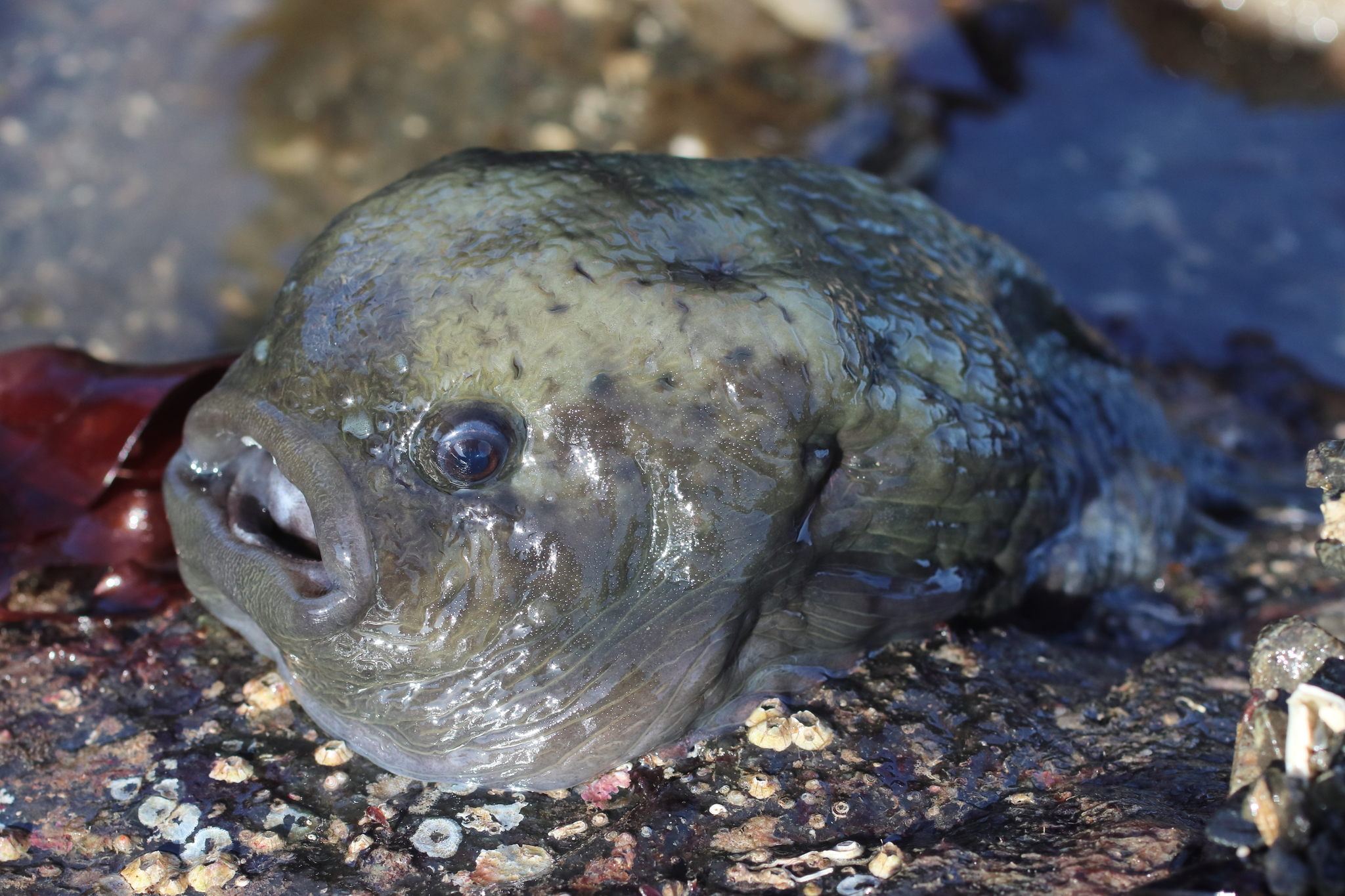
Aptocyclus ventricosus, better known as the smooth lumpfish

Lumpsuckers are named appropriately enough; their portly bodies are nearly spherical with generally drab coloration and lithic patterns. The "sucker" part refers to the fish's modified pelvic fins, which have evolved into adhesive discs (located ventrally, behind the pectoral fins); the fish use these discs to adhere to the substrate. Many species have bony, wart-like tubercles adorning the head and body; these are important taxonomic features of the family.

The simple, rounded fins are small with the exception of the broad, fan-like pectorals, which actually extend ventrally. The first of the two dorsal fins is spinous, with 4–8 spines; in some species, this fin is completely overgrown with skin and therefore not visible. While the lateral line in lumpsuckers is otherwise reduced or absent, it is well developed in the head; some species even have tubular, whisker-like external projections of the opercular canal, which is a part of the cranial lateral line system.

The relatively small mouths of lumpsuckers are lined with narrow rows of small conical teeth. The gas bladder is absent. In terms of length, lumpsuckers range in size from 2 cm (0.79 in) in the case of Eumicrotremus awae up to more than 50 cm (1 ft 8 in) in the case of the common lumpsucker Cyclopterus lumpus.

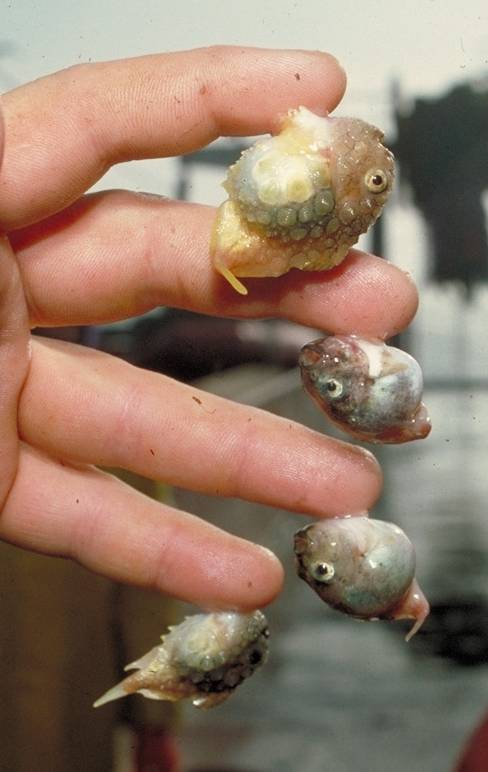
Eumicrotremus phrynoides and Eumicrotremus orbis demonstrating adhesive pelvic discs.

== Habitat and diet ==
As their appearance might suggest, lumpsuckers are poor swimmers. Most species are benthic; that is, they spend most of their time on or near the bottom. The fish are found on rocky or muddy substrates, where their colouration allows for effective camouflage. Members of the family are found primarily on the continental shelf or slope, at depths down to 1,700 m (5,600 ft). Some of the deeper-living species are, however, pelagic remaining some distance above the ocean floor.

Benthic species feed on sessile invertebrates such as polychaete worms, crustaceans and mollusks. Pelagic species target prey they are capable of overtaking, namely slow-moving jellyfish and ctenophores.

Before their yolk is completely absorbed, juvenile lumpsuckers consume the larvae of crustaceans, which grow on seaweed near the surface, and smaller halacarid mites. Juveniles consume larger harpacticoids and isopods after they have absorbed their yolk.

== Behaviour and reproduction ==
Lumpsuckers are a poorly studied group, with little known of their behaviour and biology. At least some species are known to travel great distances in order to spawn in shallow, intertidal waters (from December to June in the smooth lumpsucker); this may well be true of all species. Males are also known to guard the brood of spherical eggs.

One of the peculiarities of lumpsuckers' neural systems is that they lack Mauthner cell neurons in their hindbrain, while these cells are present in virtually all other teleost fish. Nevertheless, lumpsuckers do have a C-startle response, which is apparently mediated by other hindbrain cells.

Hatchlings have well-developed pectoral fins and adhesive pelvic discs, which the fish use to cling to rocks in shallow water. Young fish remain in shallow, warmer water until fully developed. Pacific cod and sablefish are known predators of lumpsuckers.

== Fishers and the lumpsucker industry ==
The only species that is targeted commercially is Cyclopterus lumpus, which is targeted primarily for its roe in Canada, Greenland, Iceland, and Norway, and to a lesser extent in Denmark and Sweden. Cyclopterus lumpus are also caught from the wild to provide broodstock for the aquaculture industry, where the fish is used as a cleaner fish to remove sea lice in salmon aquaculture.

== Species ==
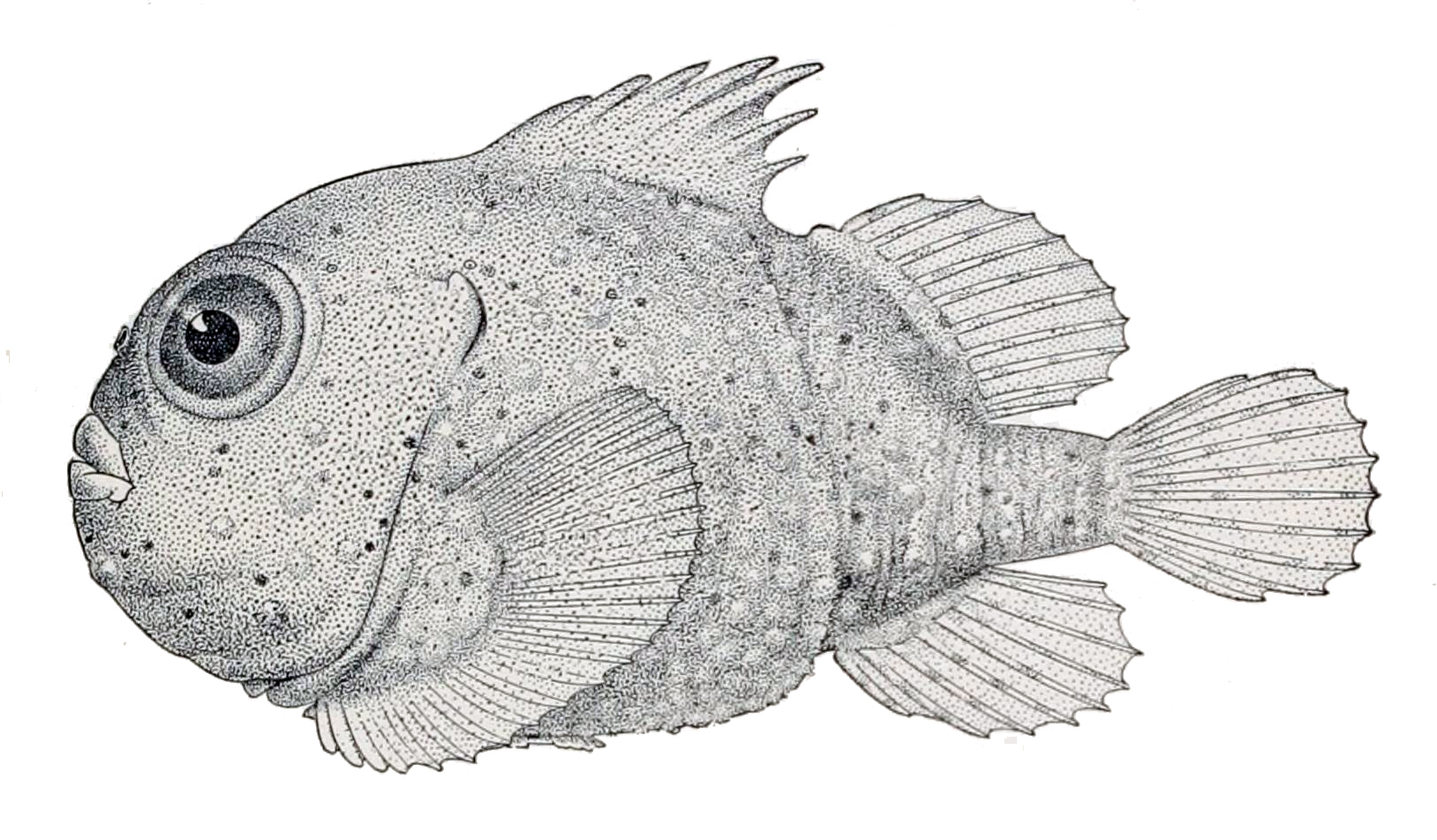
Eumicrotremus phrynoides

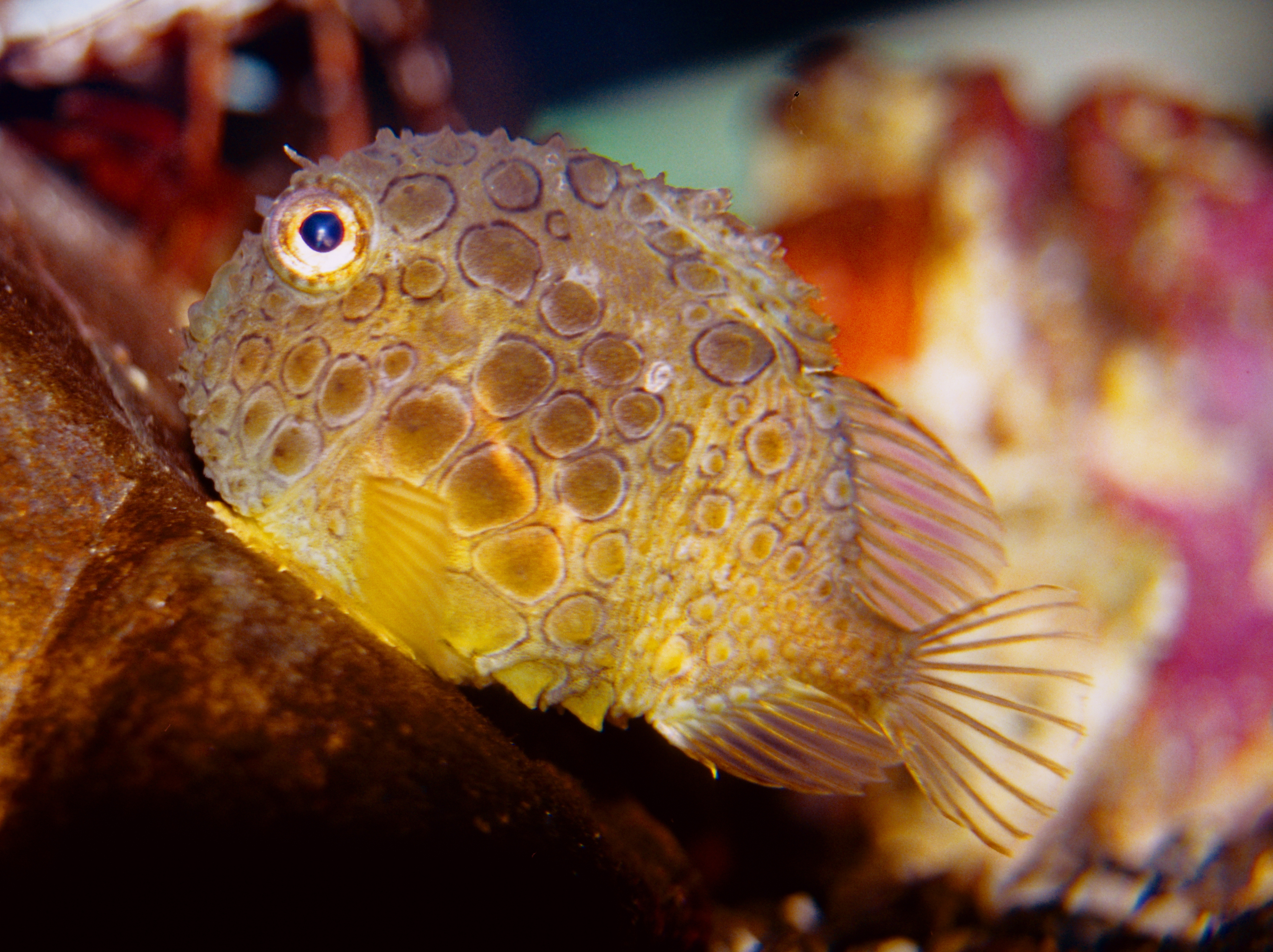
Eumicrotremus orbis

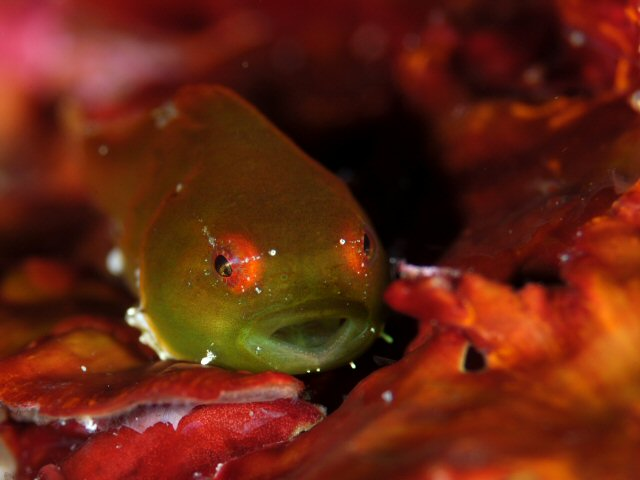
Eumicrotremus awae

Eumicrotremus pacificus

There are about 30 species in eight genera:

- Genus Aptocyclus De la Pylaie, 1835
  - Aptocyclus ventricosus (Pallas, 1769) (Smooth lumpsucker)
- Genus Cyclopsis Popov, 1930
  - Cyclopsis tentacularis Popov, 1930
- Genus Cyclopteropsis Soldatov & Popov, 1929
  - Cyclopteropsis bergi Popov, 1929
  - Cyclopteropsis brashnikowi (P. Y. Schmidt, 1904)
  - Cyclopteropsis inarmatus Mednikov (ru) & Prokhorov, 1956 (Bumpy lumpsucker)
  - Cyclopteropsis jordani Soldatov, 1929 (Smooth lumpfish)
  - Cyclopteropsis lindbergi Soldatov, 1930
  - Cyclopteropsis mcalpini (Fowler, 1914) (Arctic lumpsucker)
  - Cyclopteropsis popovi Soldatov, 1929
- Genus Cyclopterus Linnaeus, 1758
  - Cyclopterus lumpus Linnaeus, 1758 (Lumpsucker)
- Genus Eumicrotremus T. N. Gill, 1862
  - Eumicrotremus andriashevi Perminov, 1936
    - E. a. aculeatus Voskoboinikova & Nazarkin, 2015 (Andriashev's spicular-spiny pimpled lumpsucker)
    - E. a. andriashevi Perminov, 1936 (Andriashev's spiny pimpled lumpsucker)
  - Eumicrotremus asperrimus (S. Tanaka (I), 1912)
  - Eumicrotremus awae D. S. Jordan & Snyder, 1902
  - Eumicrotremus derjugini Popov, 1926 (Leather-fin lumpsucker)
  - Eumicrotremus eggvinii Koefoed, 1956
  - Eumicrotremus gyrinops (Garman, 1892)
  - Eumicrotremus jindoensis S. J. Lee, J.-K. Kim, Y. Kai, S. Ikeguchi, & T. Nakabo, 2017
  - Eumicrotremus orbis (Günther, 1861) (Pacific spiny lumpsucker)
  - Eumicrotremus pacificus P. Y. Schmidt, 1904
  - Eumicrotremus phrynoides C. H. Gilbert & Burke, 1912 (Toad lumpsucker)
  - Eumicrotremus schmidti Lindberg & Legeza, 1955
  - Eumicrotremus spinosus (J. C. Fabricius, 1776) (Atlantic spiny lumpsucker)
  - Eumicrotremus taranetzi Perminov, 1936
  - Eumicrotremus tartaricus Lindberg & Legeza, 1955
  - Eumicrotremus terraenovae G. S. Myers & J. E. Böhlke, 1950
  - Eumicrotremus uenoi S. J. Lee, J.-K. Kim, Y. Kai, S. Ikeguchi, & T. Nakabo, 2017
- Genus Georgimarinus Voskoboinikova & Nazarkin, 2015
  - Georgimarinus barbatus (Lindberg & Legeza, 1955)
- Genus Lethotremus C. H. Gilbert, 1896
  - Lethotremus muticus C. H. Gilbert, 1896
- Genus Microancathus Voskoboinikova, 2015
  - Microancathus fedorovi (Mandritsa, 1991) (Fedorov's lumpsucker)
  - Microancathus tokranovi Voskoboinikova, 2015 (Tokranov's lumpsucker)
- Genus Proeumicrotremus Voskoboinikova & Orlov, 2020
  - Proeumicrotremus soldatovi (Popov, 1930)
