= Eumicrotremus uenoi =

Scientific classification
- Domain: Eukaryota
- Kingdom: Animalia
- Phylum: Chordata
- Class: Actinopterygii
- Order: Perciformes
- Suborder: Cottoidei
- Family: Cyclopteridae
- Genus: Eumicrotremus
- Species: E. uenoi

Binomial name
- Eumicrotremus uenoi Kai, Ikeguchi & Nakabo, 2017

Species of lumpfish

Eumicrotremus uenoi is a species of lumpfish native to the Northwest Pacific. It is found off the Korean Peninsula and Japan, where it occurs at a depth range of 90 to 100 m (295 to 328 ft). It is a very small demersal fish, reaching 2 cm (0.8 inches) SL. The species was named after Dr. Tatsuji Ueno, formerly of the Hokkaido Fisheries Experimental Station, in honor of his work with the systematics of Cyclopteridae, the lumpfishes. It was described in 2017 following a taxonomic review of "dwarf" lumpfishes that also resulted in the description of Eumicrotremus jindoensis and the reclassification of the species Lethotremus awae as Eumicrotremus awae.
