= Eumicrotremus jindoensis =

Scientific classification
- Domain: Eukaryota
- Kingdom: Animalia
- Phylum: Chordata
- Class: Actinopterygii
- Order: Perciformes
- Suborder: Cottoidei
- Family: Cyclopteridae
- Genus: Eumicrotremus
- Species: E. jindoensis

Binomial name
- Eumicrotremus jindoensis Kai, Ikeguchi & Nakabo, 2017

Species of lumpfish

Eumicrotremus jindoensis is a species of lumpfish native to the Northwest Pacific, where it may be found off the coast of the Korean Peninsula and in the Yellow Sea. The specific name "jindoensis" is derived from the type locality, Jin-do Island. It occurs at a depth range of 20 to 30 metres (66 to 98 ft), and it reaches 2.5 centimetres (1 in) SL. This species was described in 2017 as part of a review of "dwarf" species of Eumicrotremus, which reclassified the species then known as Lethotremus awae as a member of Eumicrotremus in addition to describing another similarly small new species, known as Eumicrotremus uenoi.
