= Cyclopteropsis jordani =

Scientific classification
- Domain: Eukaryota
- Kingdom: Animalia
- Phylum: Chordata
- Class: Actinopterygii
- Order: Perciformes
- Suborder: Cottoidei
- Family: Cyclopteridae
- Genus: Cyclopteropsis
- Species: C. jordani

Binomial name
- Cyclopteropsis jordani Soldatov, 1929

Species of lumpfish

Cyclopteropsis jordani, also known as the smooth lumpfish (although that name may lead to confusion with Aptocyclus ventricosus), is a species of lumpfish native to the Arctic and Northwest Atlantic, where it is known from the Kara Sea in Russia and Admiralty inlet in Nunavut, Canada. It is a benthic species found at depths less than 68 m (223 ft) and reaches 6.1 cm (2.4 inches) in standard length. C. jordani feeds on small invertebrates, including mollusks, crustaceans, and marine worms.
