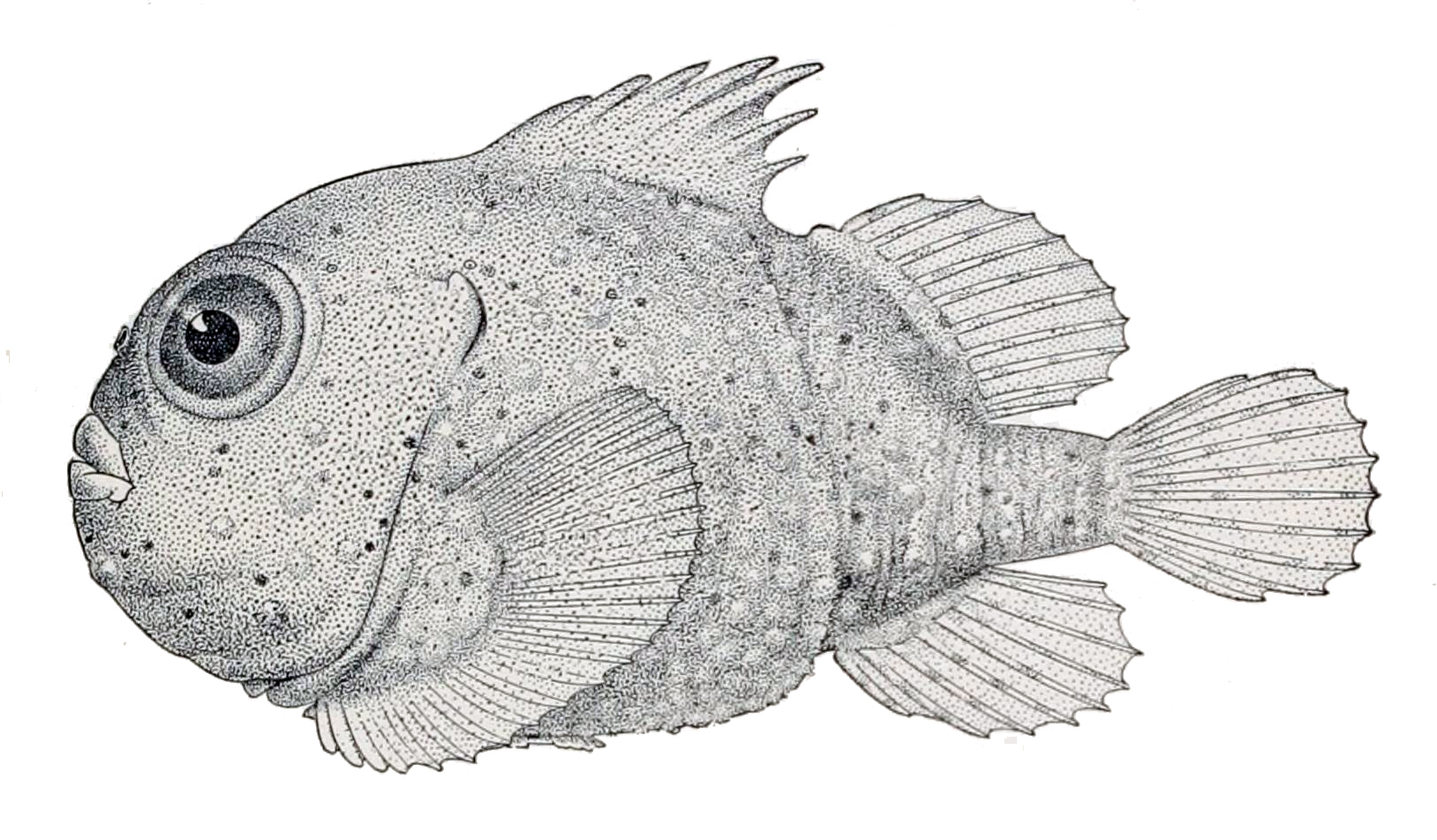

Scientific classification
- Domain: Eukaryota
- Kingdom: Animalia
- Phylum: Chordata
- Class: Actinopterygii
- Order: Perciformes
- Suborder: Cottoidei
- Family: Cyclopteridae
- Genus: Eumicrotremus
- Species: E. phrynoides

Binomial name
- Eumicrotremus phrynoides C. H. Gilbert & Burke, 1912

Synonyms
- Cyclopterocottus phrynoides (C. H. Gilbert & Burke, 1912); Cyclopteropsis phrynoides (C. H. Gilbert & Burke, 1912)

= Toad lumpsucker =

Species of fish

The toad lumpsucker (Eumicrotremus phrynoides) is a species of fish in the family Cyclopteridae that can be found in the Bering Sea and the Gulf of Alaska, where it occurs at depths of 69 to 170 metres (226 to 558 ft). It is a demersal fish that reaches a maximum of 7.4 centimetres (2.9 in) in total length, making it a moderately sized member of Eumicrotremus.
