= Cyclopteropsis brashnikowi =

Scientific classification
- Kingdom: Animalia
- Phylum: Chordata
- Class: Actinopterygii
- Order: Perciformes
- Suborder: Cottoidei
- Family: Cyclopteridae
- Genus: Cyclopteropsis
- Species: C. brashnikowi

Binomial name
- Cyclopteropsis brashnikowi (Schmidt, 1904)

Synonyms
- Eumicrotremus brashnikowi Schmidt, 1904

Species of fish

Cyclopteropsis brashnikowi is a species of lumpfish native to the Sea of Okhotsk and the Northwest Pacific off of the Kuril Islands, where it is found at a depth of 30 to 303 metres (98 to 994 ft). Adult individuals of the species have been noted to resemble the related species C. popovi, suggesting that the two species names may be synonymous. It is of disputed classification, being considered a species of Eumicrotremus by some authors (Eumicrotremus is also the genus that the species was originally classified under by Peter Schmidt in 1904), although sources such as FishBase, WoRMS, and ITIS do not follow this classification.
