= Cyclopteropsis popovi =

Scientific classification
- Domain: Eukaryota
- Kingdom: Animalia
- Phylum: Chordata
- Class: Actinopterygii
- Order: Perciformes
- Suborder: Cottoidei
- Family: Cyclopteridae
- Genus: Cyclopteropsis
- Species: C. popovi

Binomial name
- Cyclopteropsis popovi Soldatov, 1929

Species of lumpfish

Cyclopteropsis popovi is a species of lumpfish native to the Northwest Pacific. It can be found from the Sea of Okhotsk to the Pacific coasts of the northern Kuril Islands. Some specimens of the related species C. brashnikowi suggest that the two might be synonymous (although sources such as FishBase still list them as two separate species), in which case C. brashnikowi would be considered the senior synonym.
