= Cyclopsis =

Scientific classification
- Kingdom: Animalia
- Phylum: Chordata
- Class: Actinopterygii
- Order: Perciformes
- Suborder: Cottoidei
- Family: Cyclopteridae
- Genus: Cyclopsis; Popov, 1930
- Species: C. tentacularis

Binomial name
- Cyclopsis tentacularis Popov, 1930

Species of fish

Cyclopsis is a monospecific genus of marine ray-finned fish belonging to the family Cyclopteridae, the lumpfishes or lumpsuckers. Its only species is Cyclopsis tentacularis which is found at depths between 12 and 140 m (39 and 459 ft) in the Sea of Okhotsk in the northwestern Pacific Ocean. This species has a maximum published standard length of 7.1 cm (2.8 in).

Cyclopsis was first proposed as a genus in 1930 by the Russian ichthyologist Alexander Mikhailovich Popov when he formally described Cyclopsis tentacularis.
