= Proeumicrotremus =

Scientific classification
- Kingdom: Animalia
- Phylum: Chordata
- Class: Actinopterygii
- Order: Perciformes
- Suborder: Cottoidei
- Family: Cyclopteridae
- Genus: Proeumicrotremus
- Species: P. soldatovi

Binomial name
- Proeumicrotremus soldatovi (Popov, 1930)

Synonyms
- Eumicrotremus soldatovi Popov, 1930

Species of lumpfish

Proeumicrotrmus is a monospecific genus of marine ray-finned fish belonging to the family Cyclopteridae, the lumpfishes or lumpsuckers. The only species in the genus is Proeumicrotremus soldatovi, Soldatov's lumpsucker. This species is found in the Northwest Pacific. It is known from the Sea of Okhotsk, where it can be found at depths of 10 to 350 m (33 to 1,148 ft). It reaches 26 cm (10 in) in total length, making it larger than average for a lumpfish. It was previously considered a species of Eumicrotremus until a morphology-based revision in 2020 concluded that it represents the only known species of a distinct genus.
