= Cyclopteropsis =

Scientific classification
- Kingdom: Animalia
- Phylum: Chordata
- Class: Actinopterygii
- Order: Perciformes
- Suborder: Cottoidei
- Family: Cyclopteridae
- Genus: Cyclopteropsis; Soldatov & Popov, 1929

Type species
- Cyclopteropsis bergi Popov, 1929

Synonyms
- Cyclopterocottus Popov, 1930; Georgimarinus Voskoboinikova & Nazarkin, 2015

Genus of fishes

Cyclopteropsis is a genus of marine ray-finned fishes belonging to the family Cyclopteridae, the lumpfishes or lumpsuckers. These small lumpfishes are found in the North Pacific and Arctic Oceans.

== Taxonomy ==
Cyclopteropsis was first proposed as a genus in 1929 by the Russian ichthyologists Vladimir Konstantinovich Soldatov and Alexander Mikhailovich Popov designating Cyclopteropsis bergi as the type species. FishBase still recognises this genus as valid, but Catalog of Fishes treats it as a synonym of Eumicrotremus.

== Species ==
There are currently seven recognized species in this genus:

- Cyclopteropsis bergi Popov, 1929
- Cyclopteropsis brashnikowi (P. J. Schmidt, 1904)
- Cyclopteropsis inarmatus Mednikov (ru) & Prokhorov, 1956 (Bumpy lumpsucker)
- Cyclopteropsis jordani Soldatov, 1929 (Smooth lumpfish)
- Cyclopteropsis lindbergi Soldatov, 1930
- Cyclopteropsis mcalpini (Fowler, 1914) (Arctic lumpsucker)
- Cyclopteropsis popovi Soldatov, 1929
