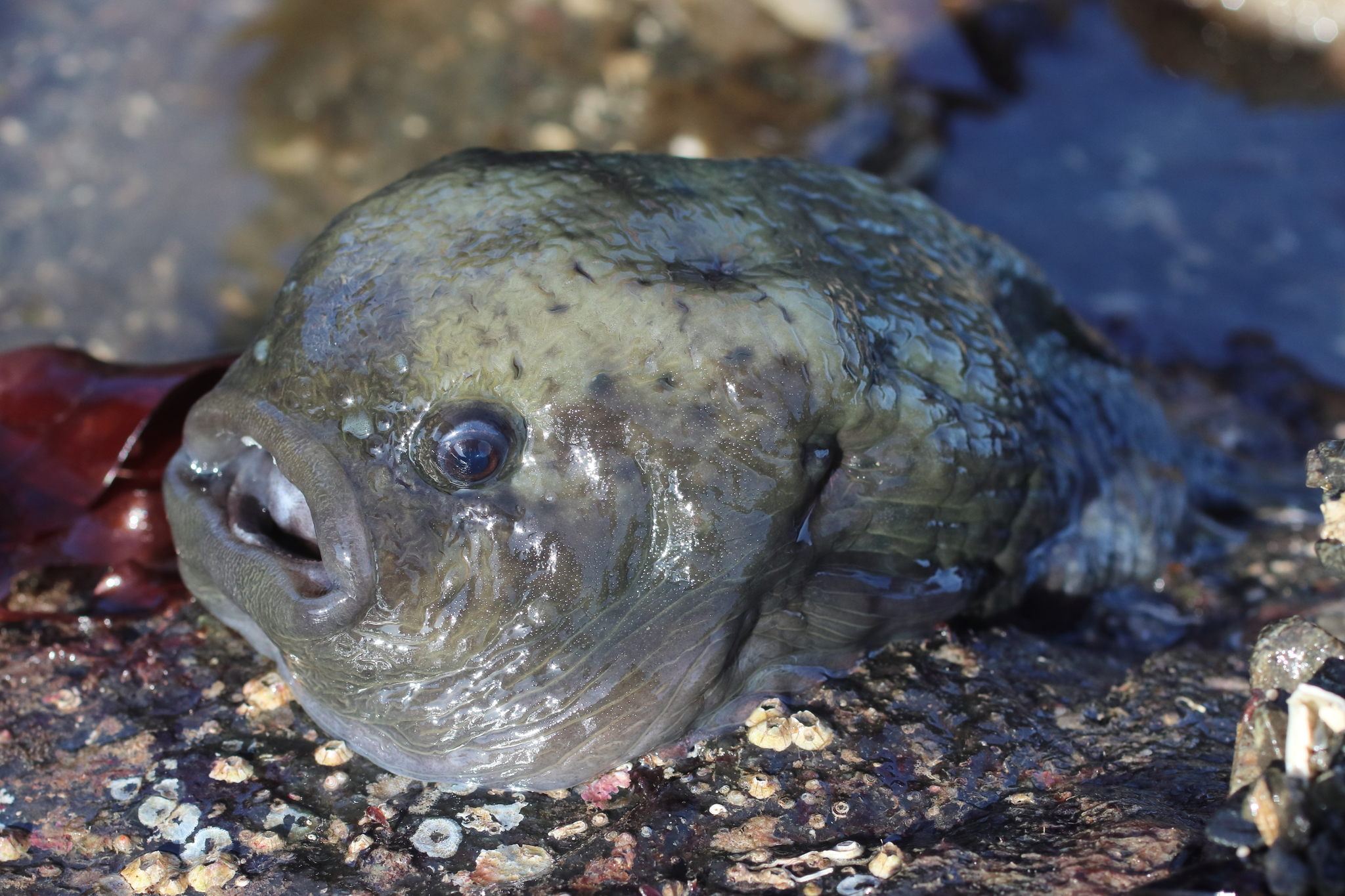

Scientific classification
- Kingdom: Animalia
- Phylum: Chordata
- Class: Actinopterygii
- Order: Perciformes
- Suborder: Cottoidei
- Family: Cyclopteridae
- Genus: Aptocyclus; De la Pylaie, 1835
- Species: A. ventricosus

Binomial name
- Aptocyclus ventricosus (Pallas, 1769)

Synonyms
- Genus: Cyclopterichthys Steindachner, 1881; Elephantichthys Hubbs & Schultz, 1934; Liparops Garman, 1892; Pelagocyclus Lindberg & Legeza, 1955; Species: Cyclopterus ventricosus Pallas, 1769; Cyclopterichthys ventricosus (Pallas, 1769); Cyclopterus stelleri Pallas, 1814; Cyclopterichthys glaber Steindachner, 1881; Elephantichthys copeianus Hubbs & Schultz, 1934; Pelagocyclus vitiazi Lindberg & Legeza, 1955

= Smooth lumpfish =

Species of fish

The smooth lumpfish (Aptocyclus ventricosus) is a species of marine ray-finned fish belonging to the family Cyclopteridae, the lumpfishes and lumpsuckers. This species is found in the northern Pacific Ocean. It is the only species in the monospecific genus Aptocyclus.

== Taxonomy ==
The smooth lumpfish was first formally described as Cyclopterus ventricosus in 1769 by the German zoologist Peter Simon Pallas with its type locality given as Tauyskaya Bay near Ol'skiy Island in the Sea of Okhotsk. In 1835 Auguste-Jean-Marie Bachelot De la Pylaie placed C. ventricosus in the monospecific genus Aptocyclus. The 5th edition of Fishes of the World does not recognize subfamilies within the Cyclopteridae, however, other authorities place the smooth lumpfish in the subfamily Liparopsinae.

== Description ==
The smooth lumpfish, or smooth lumpsucker, is a deep sea fish species with a body length of 6–44 cm (2.4–17.3 in) and body weight of 0.05–4.20 kg (0.11–9.26 lb) on average. They look brownish gray with dark spots dorsally, muddy gray ventrally. They have naked skin without scales and tubercles. A smooth lumpfish has no dorsal spines or anal spines, eight to nine dorsal soft rays, and seven to nine anal soft rays. They have a rounded caudal fin and large and broadly based pectoral fins. Their pelvic fins are modified to form a clinging disc with a thickened margin on the ventral surface of the body. They have their first dorsal fins completed embedded under the skin.

== Habitat and diet ==
Smooth lumpfish are widely distributed throughout the North Pacific, especially in the Aleutian Basin. They inhabit both near-bottom and mid-water layers, ranging from 5 to 1,700 m. They are preyed upon by certain fish species, marine mammals and seabirds. Their preferred diet consists of medusa and ctenophores, and they occasionally also feed on pelagic polychaetes and crustaceans.

== Reproduction ==
The smooth lumpfish is an iteroparous gonochoristic species with determinate fecundity, group-synchronous ovary organization, total spawning (release of 1 batch of eggs per breeding season), and external fertilization. Smooth lumpfish perform spawning migration from deep-ocean to coastal zones, where breeding occurs over a rocky bottom at depths shallower than 10 m (33 ft). A thick envelope protects these demersal eggs from mechanical damage during development in the coastal zone. The incubation time between fertilization and hatching is more than 40 days. Males protect the egg clusters after females spawn.
