= Cyclopteropsis bergi =

Scientific classification
- Domain: Eukaryota
- Kingdom: Animalia
- Phylum: Chordata
- Class: Actinopterygii
- Order: Perciformes
- Suborder: Cottoidei
- Family: Cyclopteridae
- Genus: Cyclopteropsis
- Species: C. bergi

Binomial name
- Cyclopteropsis bergi Popov, 1929

Species of lumpfish

Cyclopteropsis bergi is a species of lumpfish native to the Northwest Pacific, where it is found at depths of 20 to 200 m (66 to 656 ft). This species reaches 7 cm (2.1 in) in total length and occurs in the Bering Sea, the Sea of Okhotsk, and the Sea of Japan where it may be found off of North Korea and Sado Island. In 2011, a single individual of the species was also reported from Sokcho, South Korea.
