= Cyclopteropsis mcalpini =

Scientific classification
- Domain: Eukaryota
- Kingdom: Animalia
- Phylum: Chordata
- Class: Actinopterygii
- Order: Perciformes
- Suborder: Cottoidei
- Family: Cyclopteridae
- Genus: Cyclopteropsis
- Species: C. mcalpini

Binomial name
- Cyclopteropsis mcalpini (Fowler, 1914)

Synonyms
- Lethotremus mcalpini Fowler, 1914

Species of lumpfish

Cyclopteropsis mcalpini, also known as the Arctic lumpsucker, is a species of lumpfish known only from the Arctic Ocean. It has been found in the Barents Sea and off the coast of northwestern Greenland, where it occurs at a depth range of 109 to 329 m (358 to 1079 ft). It is a small fish, growing to 7.5 cm (3 inches) in total length. Arctic lumpsuckers are reported to usually lay between 60 and 70 eggs (each with a diameter of 5 mm), which are deposited in protected areas such as empty shells.
