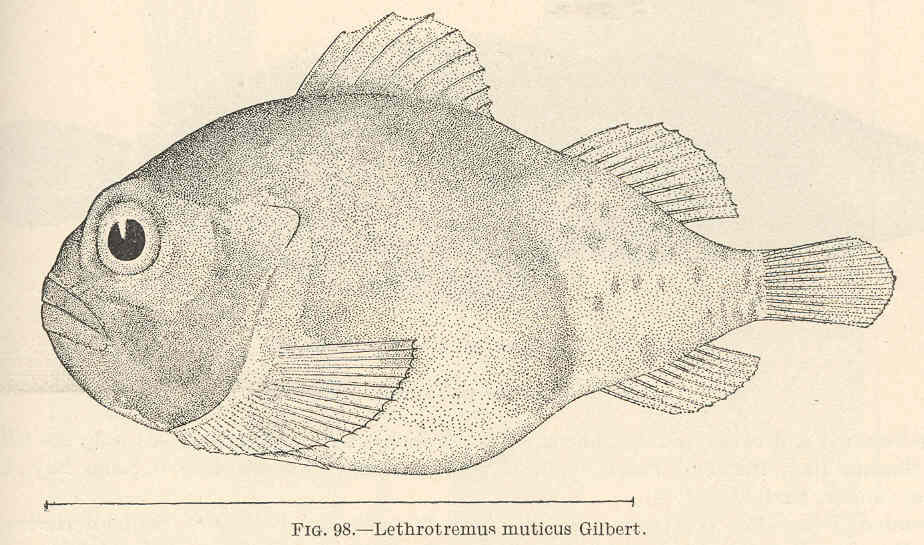

Scientific classification
- Kingdom: Animalia
- Phylum: Chordata
- Class: Actinopterygii
- Order: Perciformes
- Suborder: Cottoidei
- Family: Cyclopteridae
- Genus: Lethotremus; Gilbert, 1896
- Species: L. muticus

Binomial name
- Lethotremus muticus C. H. Gilbert, 1896

= Lethotremus =

Genus of fishes

Lethotremus is a monospecific genus of marine ray-finned fish belonging to the family Cyclopteridae, the lumpfishes or lumpsuckers. This genus is found in the northern Pacific Ocean. Following a 2017 taxonomic review by Lee et al., the species Lethotremus awae was reclassified as a species of Eumicrotremus, leaving the genus monotypic with Lethotremus muticus as its only species. Also known as the docked snailfish (a somewhat misleading name as this species is not one of the true snailfish in the family Liparidae), is a species of lumpfish native to the Northeast Pacific. It is known from the Bering Sea and the Aleutian Islands, where its range extends to Unimak Pass, and it occurs at a depth range of 58 to 330 m (190 to 1,083 ft). It is a benthic species that reaches 11.5 cm (4.5 in) in total length. It can be found on substrates of mud, rock, or gravel, and it is currently the only known species of Lethotremus, following a reclassification of the second described species in the genus as Eumicrotremus awae.
