= Eumicrotremus barbatus =

Conservation status
- Data Deficient (IUCN 3.1)

Scientific classification
- Kingdom: Animalia
- Phylum: Chordata
- Class: Actinopterygii
- Order: Perciformes
- Suborder: Cottoidei
- Family: Cyclopteridae
- Genus: Eumicrotremus
- Species: E. barbatus

Binomial name
- Eumicrotremus barbatus Lindberg & Legeza, 1955

Synonyms
- Georgimarinus barbatus Lindberg & Legeza, 1955

Species of fish

Eumicrotremus barbatus, the papillose lumpsucker, is a species of marine ray-finned fish belonging to the family Cyclopteridae, the lumpfishes or lumpsuckers, found in the north Pacific Ocean. This species is characterized by the following unique apomorphies: teeth in the outer row at symphysis of premaxillae fuse with premaxillae, teeth at symphysis of dentary fuse among themselves and with dentary, forming the regular cutting edge; there are numerous barbs on the head and body; the bony plaques located in centers of connective tissue tubercles leaving the edges free. This species was originally classified in the monospecific genus Georgimarinus, but it is now regarded as a species within Eumicrotremus.
