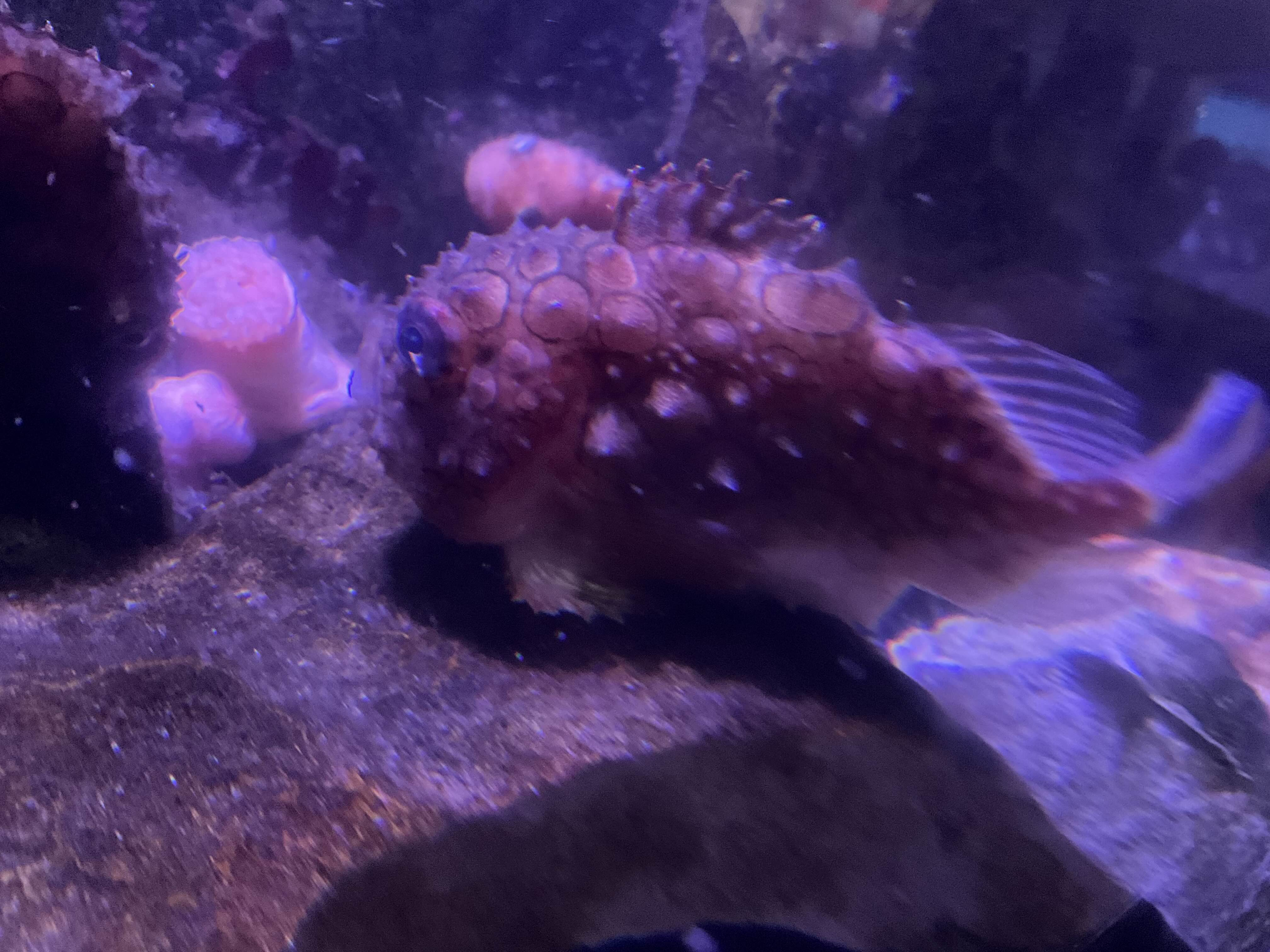
- At the Vancouver Aquarium
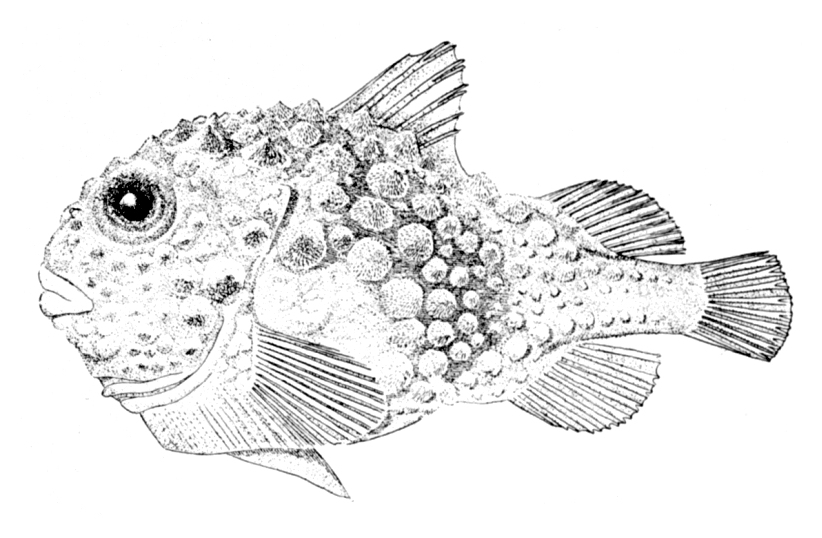
- 1896 illustration

Conservation status
- Data Deficient (IUCN 3.1)

- Secure (NatureServe)

Scientific classification
- Kingdom: Animalia
- Phylum: Chordata
- Class: Actinopterygii
- Order: Perciformes
- Suborder: Cottoidei
- Family: Cyclopteridae
- Genus: Eumicrotremus
- Species: E. spinosus

Binomial name
- Eumicrotremus spinosus (J. C. Fabricius, 1776)

Synonyms
- Cyclopterus spinosus J. C. Fabricius, 1776; Lethotremus armouri Fowler, 1914; Eumicrotremus spinosus eggvinii Koefoed, 1956; Eumicrotremus eggvinii Koefoed, 1956

= Eumicrotremus spinosus =

Species of ray-finned fish

Eumicrotremus spinosus, commonly known as the Atlantic spiny lumpsucker, is a species of lumpfish native to the Arctic and North Atlantic.

== Taxonomy ==
Eumicrotremus spinosus was first formally described as Cyclopterus spinosus in 1776 by the Danish zoologist Johan Christian Fabricius, with its type locality given as Greenland.

In 1862 the American biologist Theodore Gill proposed a new genus Eumicrotremus with Fabricius's Cyclopterus spinosus designated as its type species.

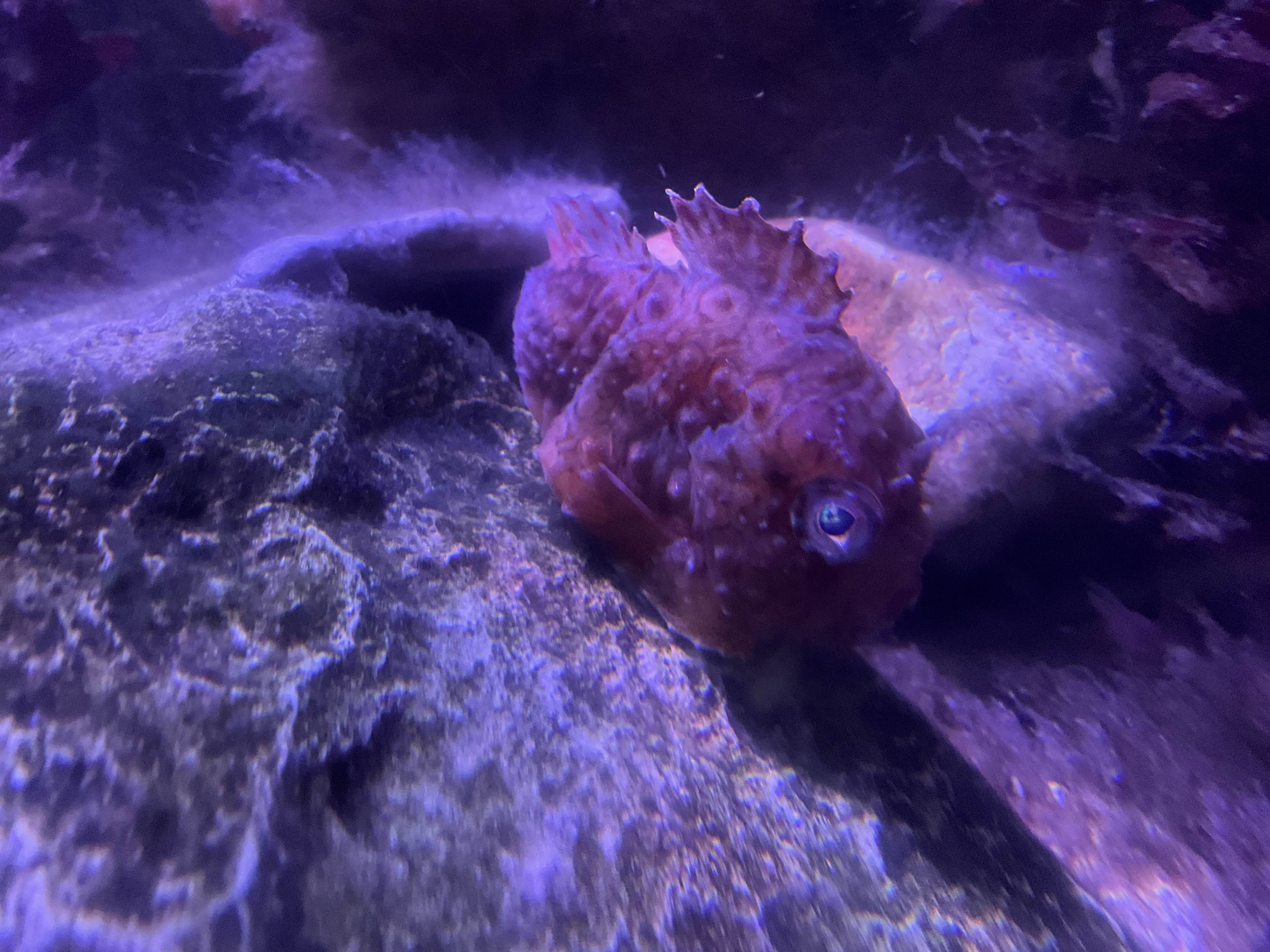
Vancouver Aquarium

== Description ==
The Atlantic spiny lumpsucker is a small fish that reaches a maximum length of 13.2 cm (5.2 in). The species appears to be variable in color but typically ranges from brown to dull orange or red. It is a benthic fish that feeds on crustaceans, smaller fishes, and Oikopleura.

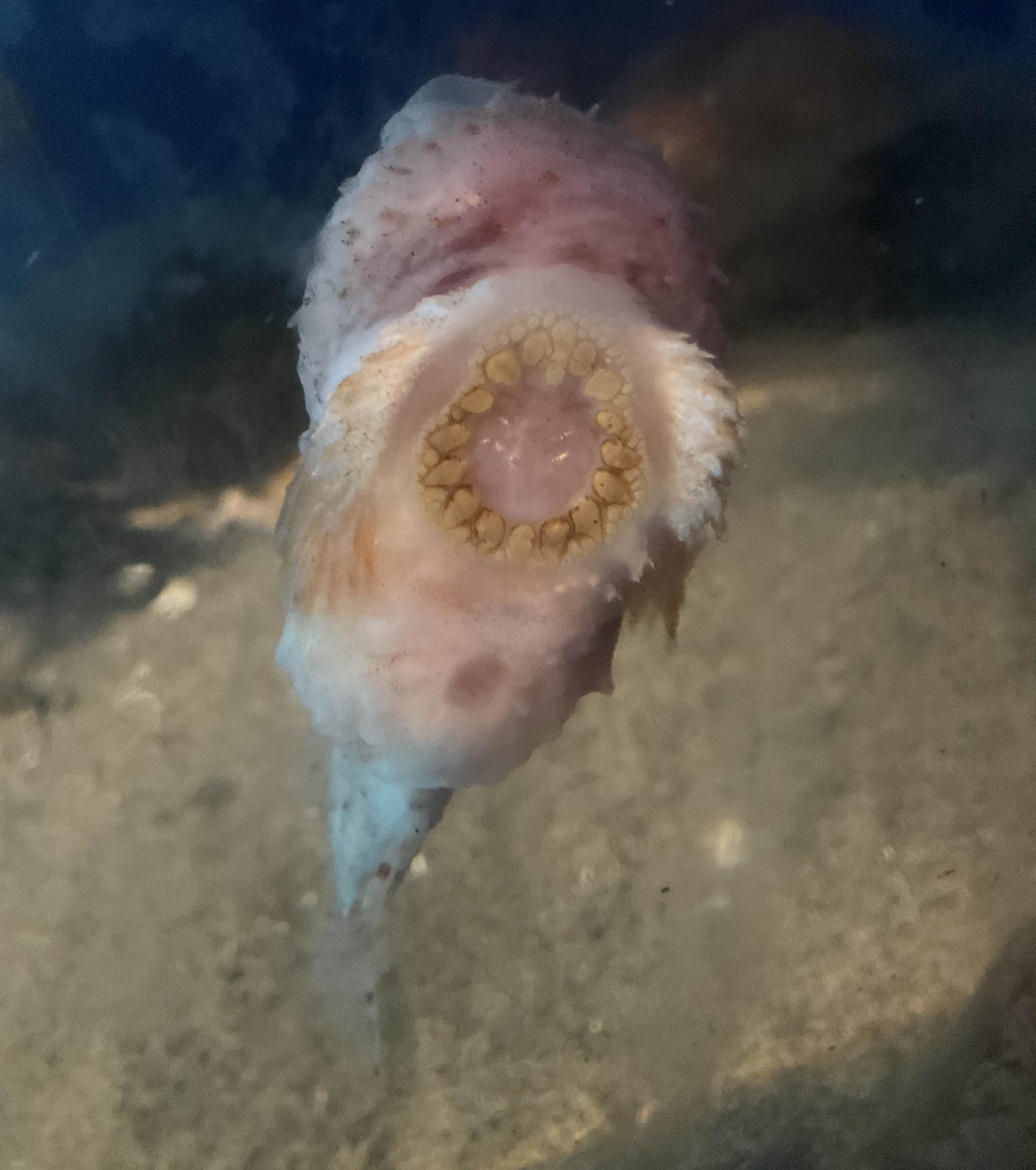
Adhering to glass with modified pelvic fins, Vancouver Aquarium

== Distribution and habitat ==
Atlantic spiny lumpsuckers are found in the Arctic and coastal parts of the North Atlantic. They are known from the Barents Sea, Svalbard, Franz Josef Land, Greenland, Iceland, Norway, the Hudson Bay, and the Canadian Arctic, as well as ranging south to Massachusetts.

Within Canada, they have been reported from Quebec, the Northwest Territories, and Nunavut. They occur at depths of 30 to 400 m (98 to 1312 ft), where they are most frequently seen over and on stony bottoms.

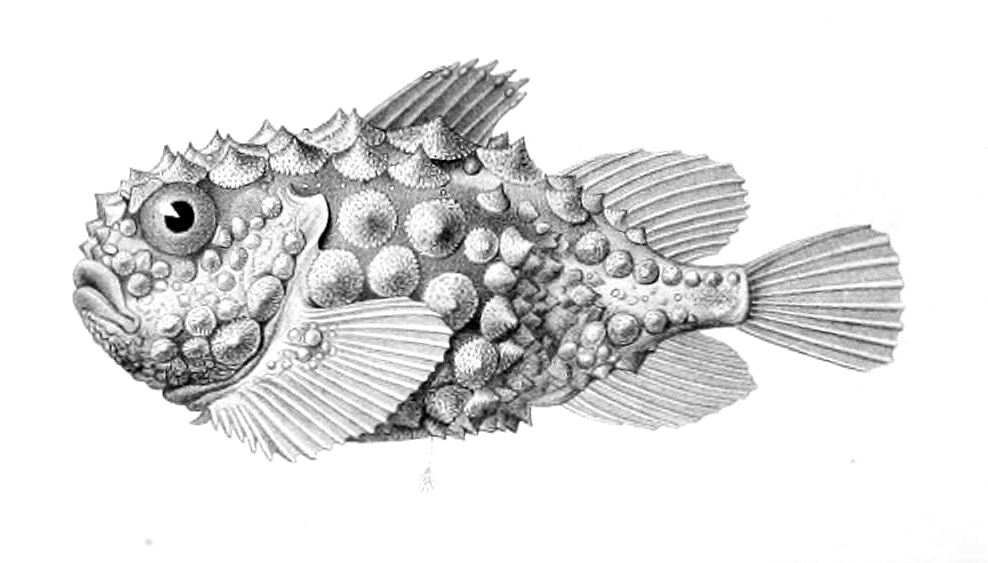
1880 illustration. Note the prominent tubercles.
