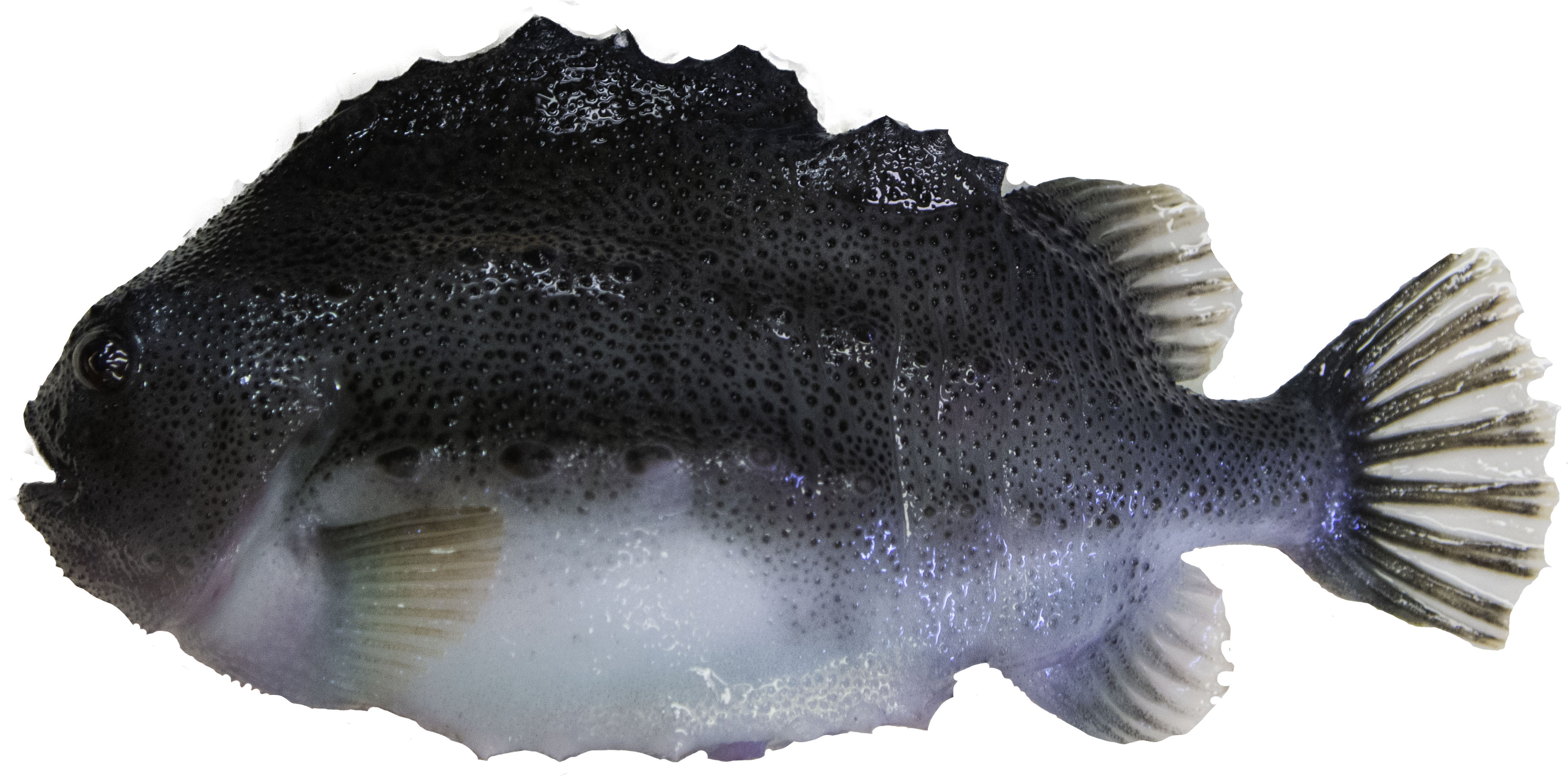

Conservation status
- Near Threatened (IUCN 3.1)

- Secure (NatureServe)

Scientific classification
- Kingdom: Animalia
- Phylum: Chordata
- Class: Actinopterygii
- Division: Teleostei
- Order: Perciformes
- Suborder: Cottoidei
- Family: Cyclopteridae
- Genus: Cyclopterus; Linnaeus, 1758
- Species: C. lumpus

Binomial name
- Cyclopterus lumpus Linnaeus, 1758

Synonyms
- Genus: Lumpus Oken, 1817; Species: Cyclopterus minutus Pallas, 1769; Cyclopterus pavoninus Shaw, 1797; Cyclopterus pyramidatus Shaw, 1804; Cyclopterus caeruleus Mitchill, 1815; Lumpus vulgaris McMurtrie, 1831; Cyclopterus coronatus Couch, 1838; Lumpus anglorum DeKay, 1842; Cyclopterus lumpus hudsonius Cox, 1920

= Cyclopterus =

Monotypic genus of fish

Cyclopterus is a genus of marine ray-finned fish belonging to the family Cyclopteridae, the lumpsuckers or lumpfish. Its only species is Cyclopterus lumpus, the lumpsucker or lumpfish. It is found in the North Atlantic and adjacent parts of the Arctic Ocean, ranging as far south as the Chesapeake Bay (rare south of New Jersey) on the North American coast and Spain (rare south of the English Channel) on the European coast. The species has been reported twice in the Mediterranean Sea, off Croatia in 2004 and Cyprus in 2017.

== Taxonomy ==
Cyclopterus lumpus was first formally described in 1758 by Carl Linnaeus in the 10th edition of the Systema Naturae with the North and Baltic Seas given as its type localities. C. lumpus was the only species described by Linnaeus in the genus and is described in Catalog of Fishes as the "type by Linnaean tautonomy". The 5th edition of Fishes of the World does not recognize subfamilies within the Cyclopteridae; however, other authorities place this taxon in the monotypic subfamily Cyclopterinae.

== Etymology ==
Cyclopterus is a compound of cyclos, meaning 'ring', with pteros, which means 'fin'. This is a reference to the pelvic fins being modified into a suction disc. The specific name lumpus is derived from the Anglo-Saxon lump and the fish was called Lumpus anglorum by Gessner in 1558. This seems to refer to the dorsal fin being embedded in the thick and tubercular skin on the back, creating the impression of a hump.

== Description ==
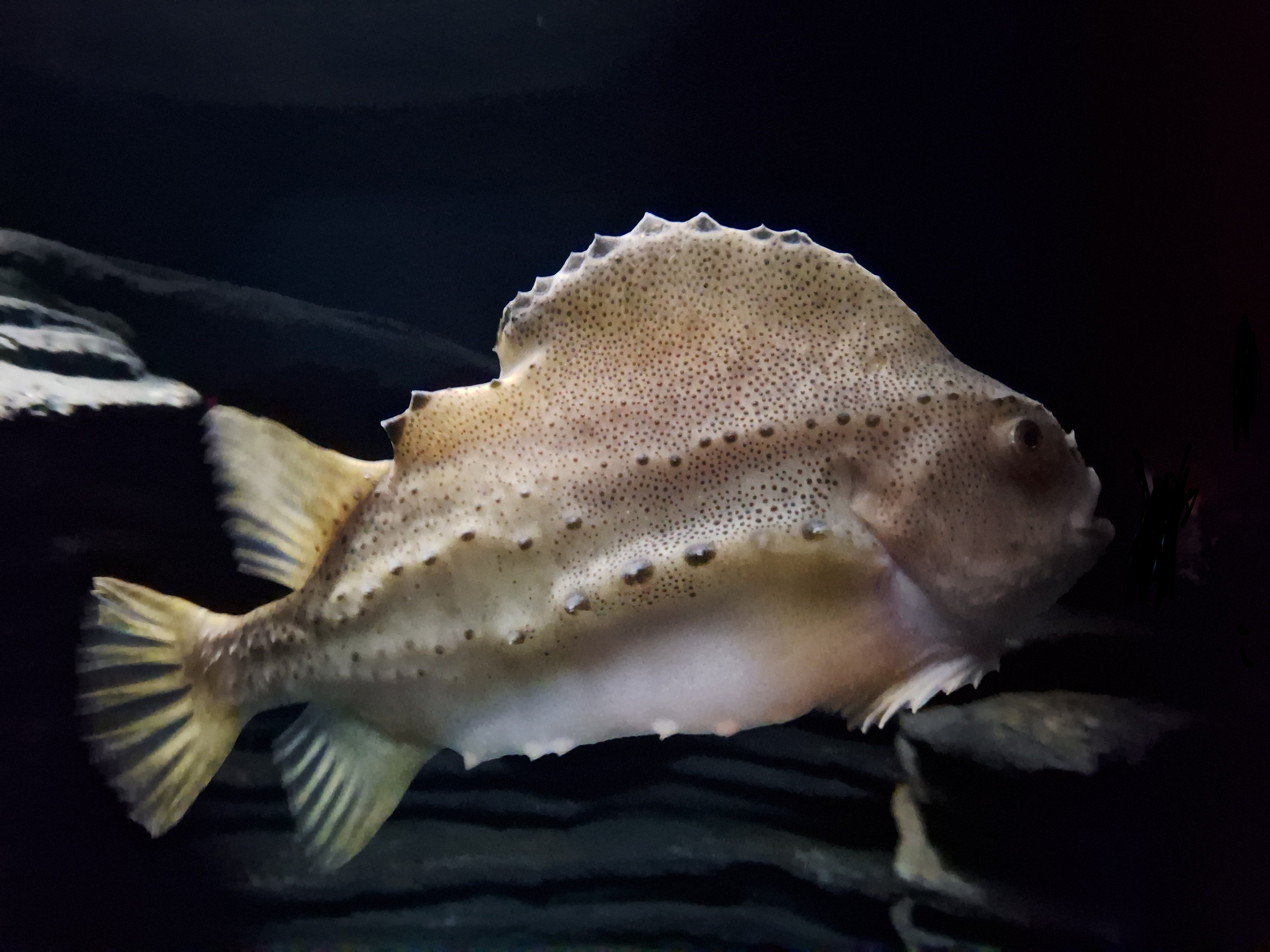
At the Monterey Bay Aquarium

Cyclopterus is sexually dimorphic with females reaching larger sizes than the males. Males typically reach 30–40 cm (12–16 in) in length while females can typically grow up to 50 cm (20 in) in length and 5 kg (11 lb 0 oz) in weight. The largest specimen recorded measured 61 cm (24 in) in length, and 9.6 kg (21 lb 3 oz) in weight. In the brackish water of the Baltic Sea, it usually does not surpass 20 cm (8 in).

The body is ball-like. It has a knobbly, ridged back and three large bony tubercles on each flank. Its pelvic fins form suction discs which it uses to attach strongly to rocks or other surfaces. The head and the pectoral fins of males are larger than those of females. It has a jelly-like layer of fat under the skin. Its colour is highly variable; bluish, greyish, olive, yellowish or brownish. Mature males turn orange-reddish during the breeding season.

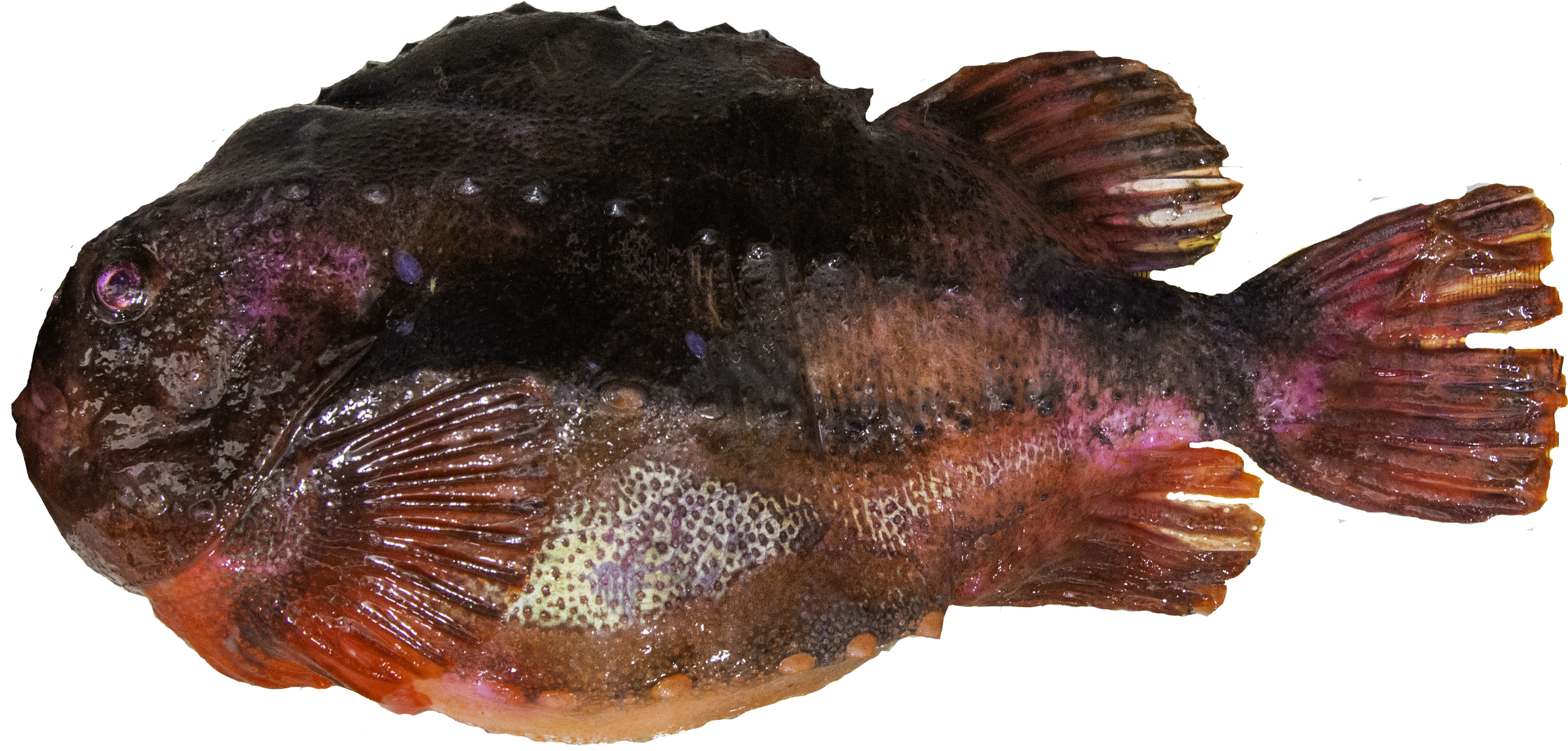
Male in breeding colours

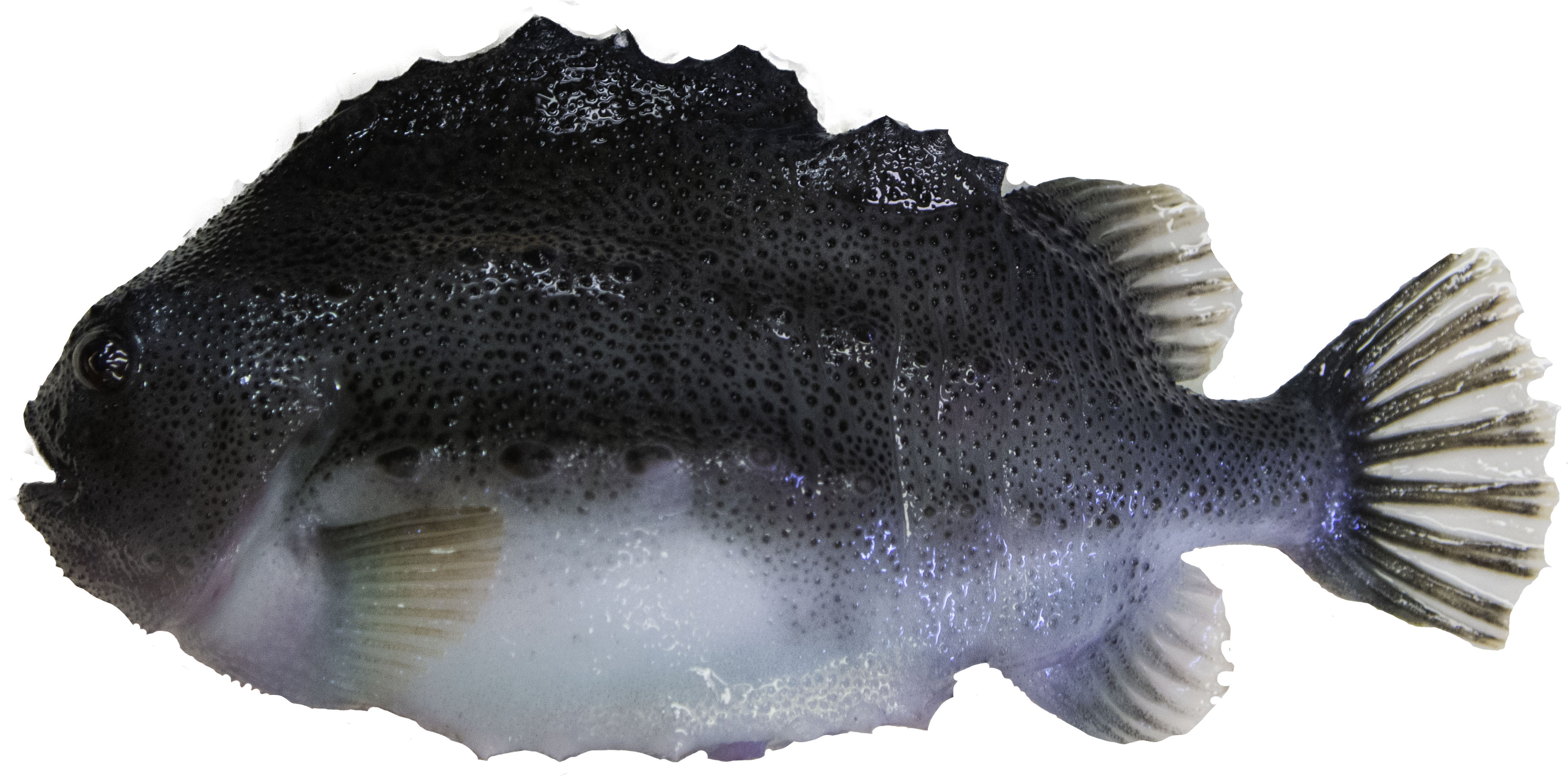
Female

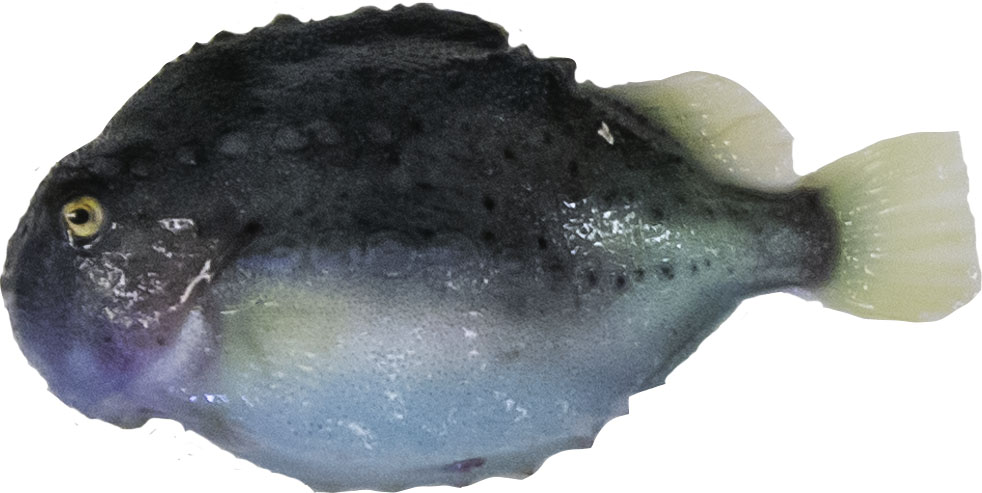
Juvenile

== Biology ==
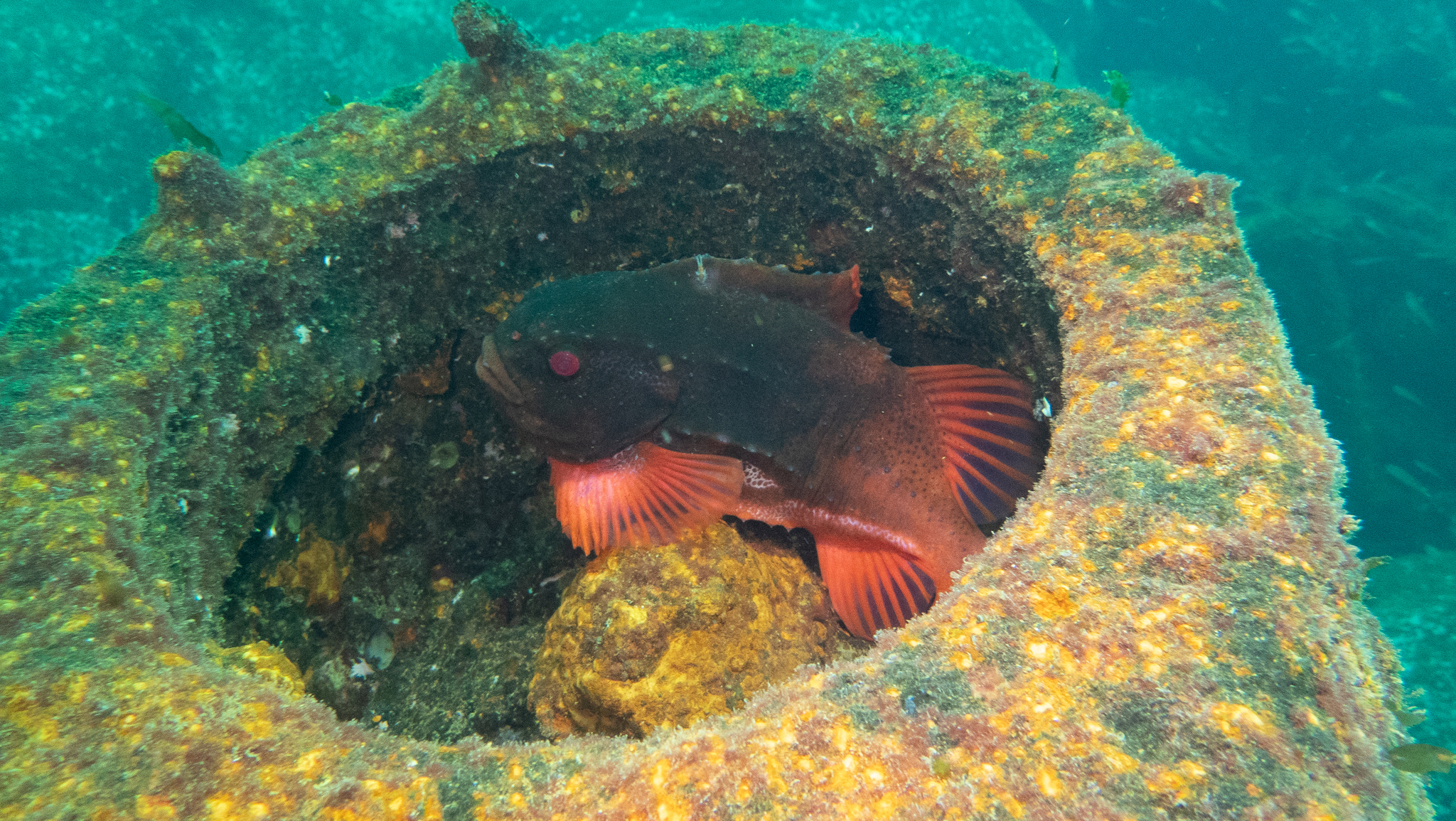
In the Shetland Islands

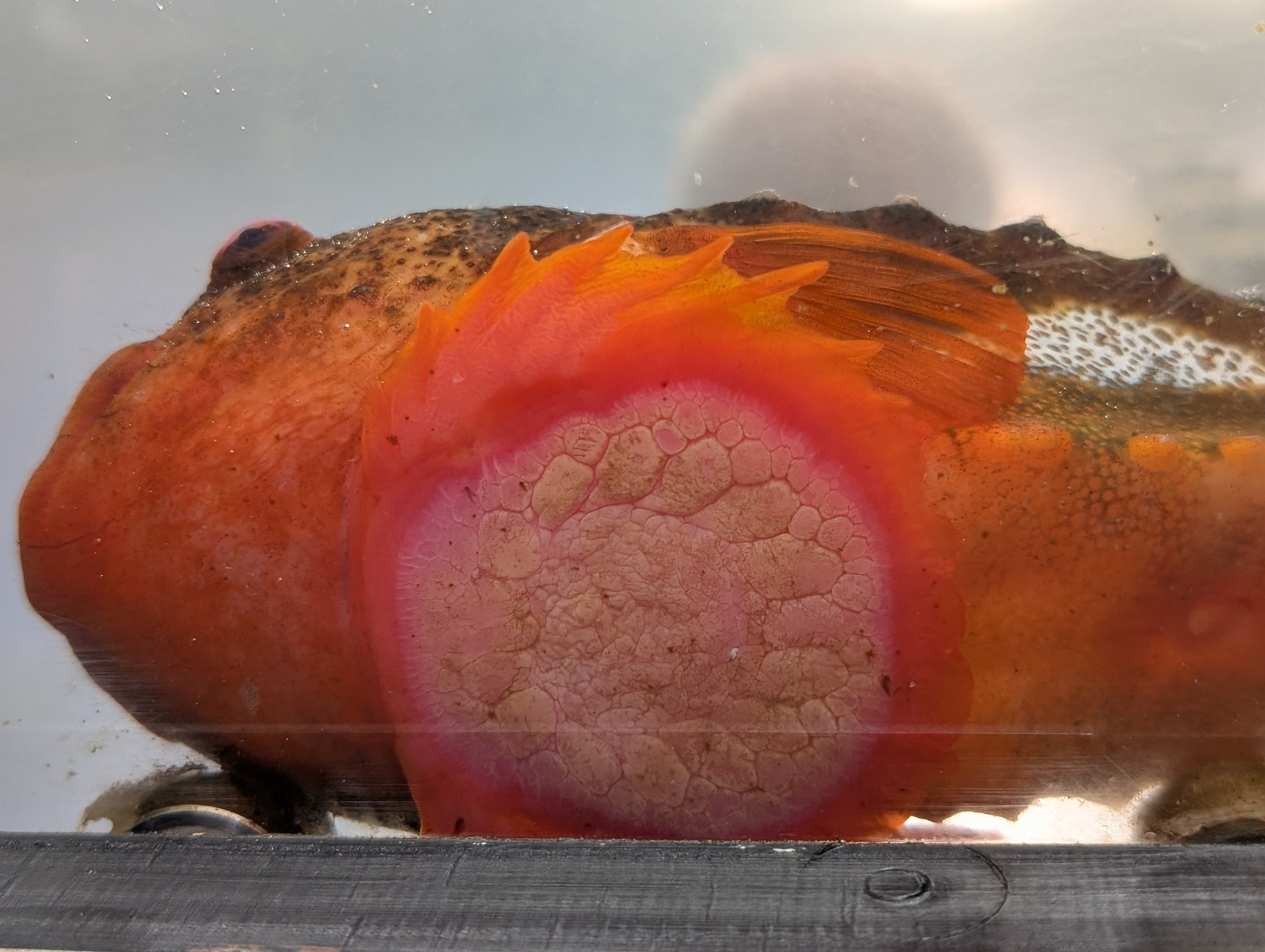
Closeup of the suction disc while attached to glass

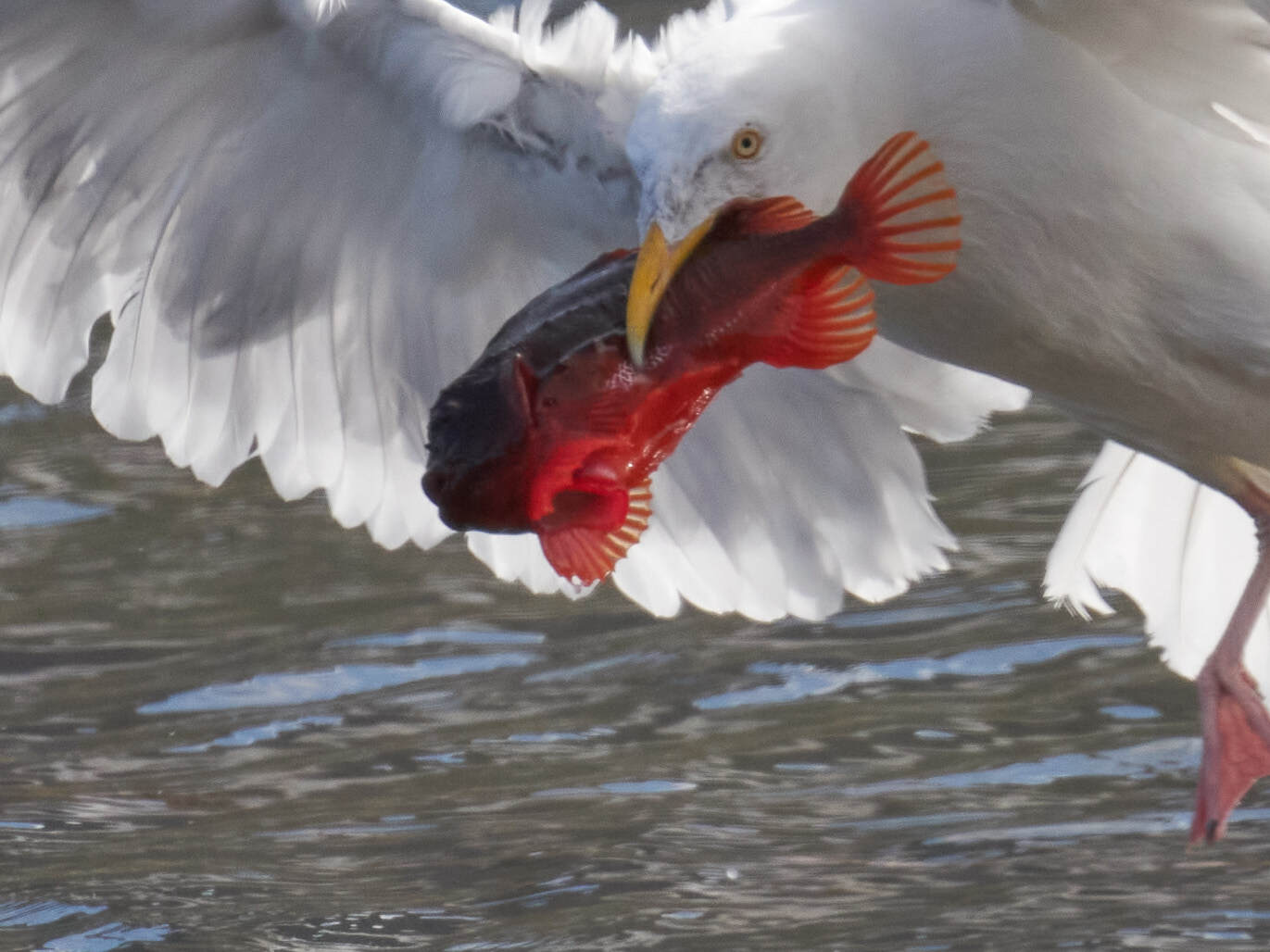
Preyed on by a glaucous gull, in Iceland

During the summer, Cyclopterus inhabit water at a temperature of −1 to 15 °C (30 to 59 °F). Juveniles are most common at temperatures of 6 to 9 °C (43 to 48 °F) while adults are more common in 4 to 8 °C (39 to 46 °F). Cyclopterus become much less common at temperatures >12 °C (54 °F).

Several aspects of their biology (i.e. lack of a swimbladder, its pelvic suction disc) led some to believe that they were a bottom dwelling species. Lumpfish are frequently caught in pelagic fishing nets, however, capture in bottom trawls is also common. An investigation using electronic data-storage tags attached to the fish have confirmed that, at least during its breeding migration, this fish will spend time associated with the sea bed, but also some time in the pelagic zone. As the fish came close to breeding, they began to spend a greater amount of time in the pelagic zone. Despite lacking a swim bladder, fish were able to make rapid movements through the water column, moving between surface waters and depths of over 300 m (980 ft) within one day. Data from research surveys and data-storage tags show that adult lumpfish alter their behaviour between night and day, spending more time in the pelagic zone at night and associating with the seabed during the day; the reasons for this are unclear. The current understanding is that after the juveniles leave coastal areas, they adopt a pelagic lifestyle, inhabiting the upper 50–60 m (160–200 ft) of the water column. It is only when they begin their return migration to the coastal areas for spawning that they begin to spend time close to the seafloor.

Juvenile lumpfish exhibit biofluorescence, that is, when they are illuminated, light absorbed by the organism is remitted in lower energy wavelengths. The light reemitted by lumpfish appears green to the human observer and peaks at 545 and 613 nm. The greatest intensity is along the tubercles of the high crest and the three longitudinal ridges. The purpose of this biofluorescence remains unclear and it is also not known if this is also exhibited by adult lumpfish.

=== Reproduction and lifecycle ===
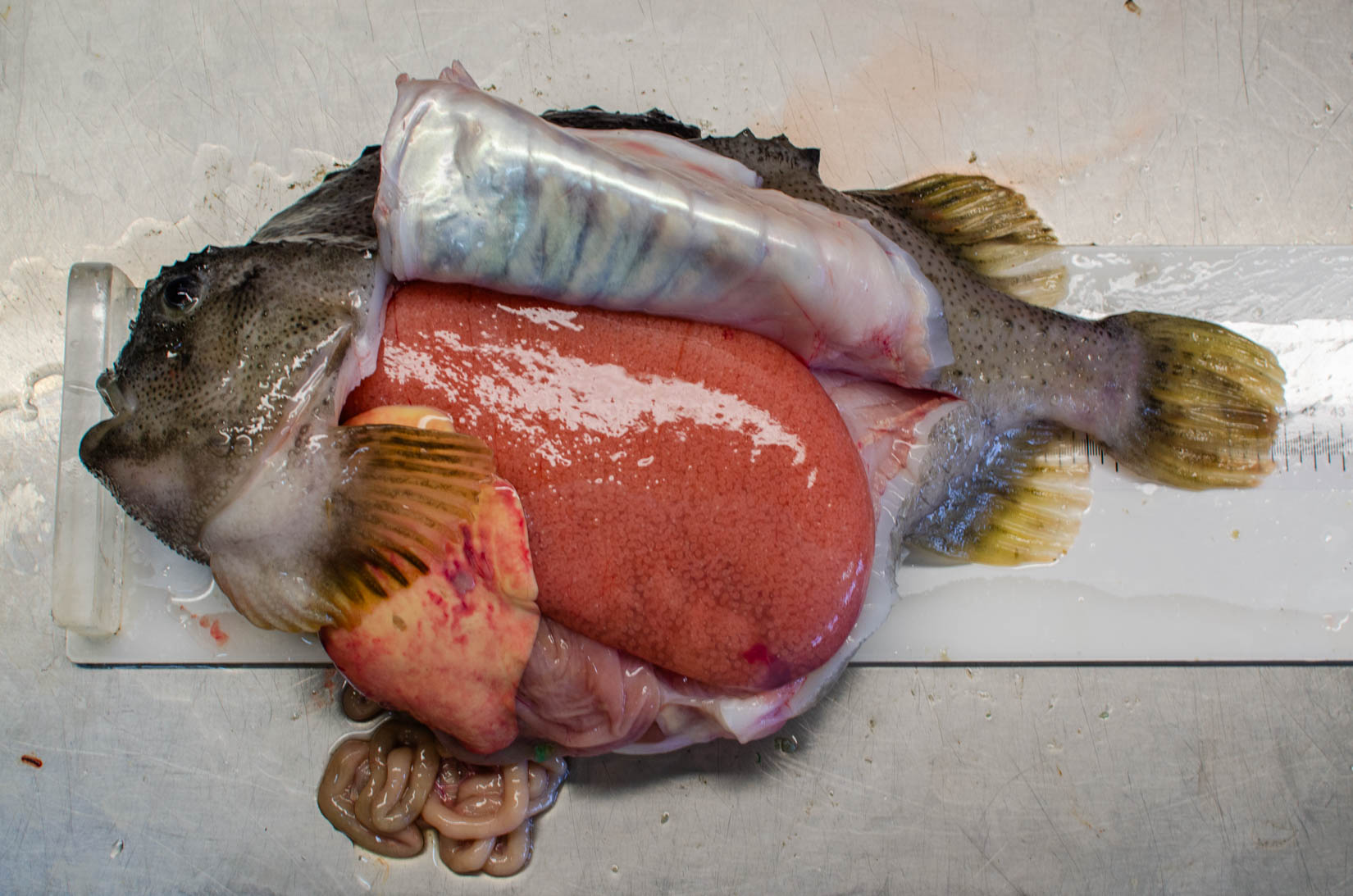
Female lumpfish close to spawning. The large orange ovary can be seen.

Cyclopterus spend the first few months following hatching in tidal pools, or in association with floating seaweed clumps. As they grow they migrate out into open water far from land where they live in the pelagic zone feeding upon gelatinous zooplankton, fish eggs and small crustaceans. When they reach maturity they will migrate to coastal areas in spring to breed. During the breeding season, males change colour, taking on a reddish/orange colouration. The population spawns over many months with spawning fish being caught in Iceland from March until August. Females which have spawned during the previous year tend to return to the same area when spawning again. They will also return at a similar time of year i.e. individuals which spawned early and late in the season will return to spawn early and late in the season the following year. A single female will lay 50,000–220,000 eggs which are laid in two batches of roughly equal size 1–2 weeks apart. The eggs are between 2.2 and 2.5 millimetres (11/128 and 13/128 in) in diameter and the ovary can account for up to one third of the weight of the female fish before spawning. The female will lay the eggs in a nest area pre-selected by the male, which will usually consist of a rocky outcrop or boulders on the seabed. The nest is in relatively shallow water (<10 metres (33 ft)) and may even be in the intertidal zone. The male also guards and cares for the eggs by fanning them with his fins during the month-long incubation period.

Young juveniles

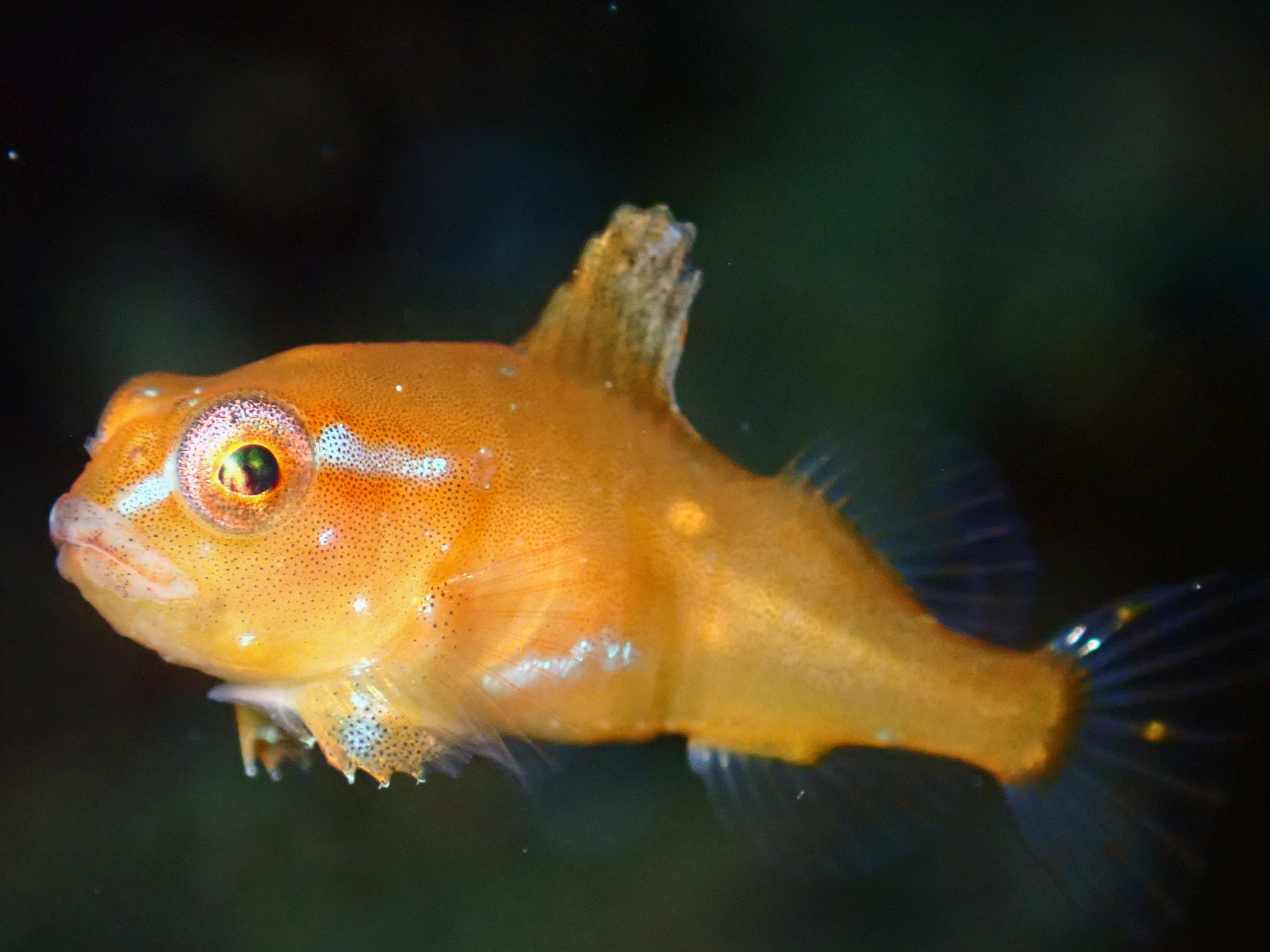

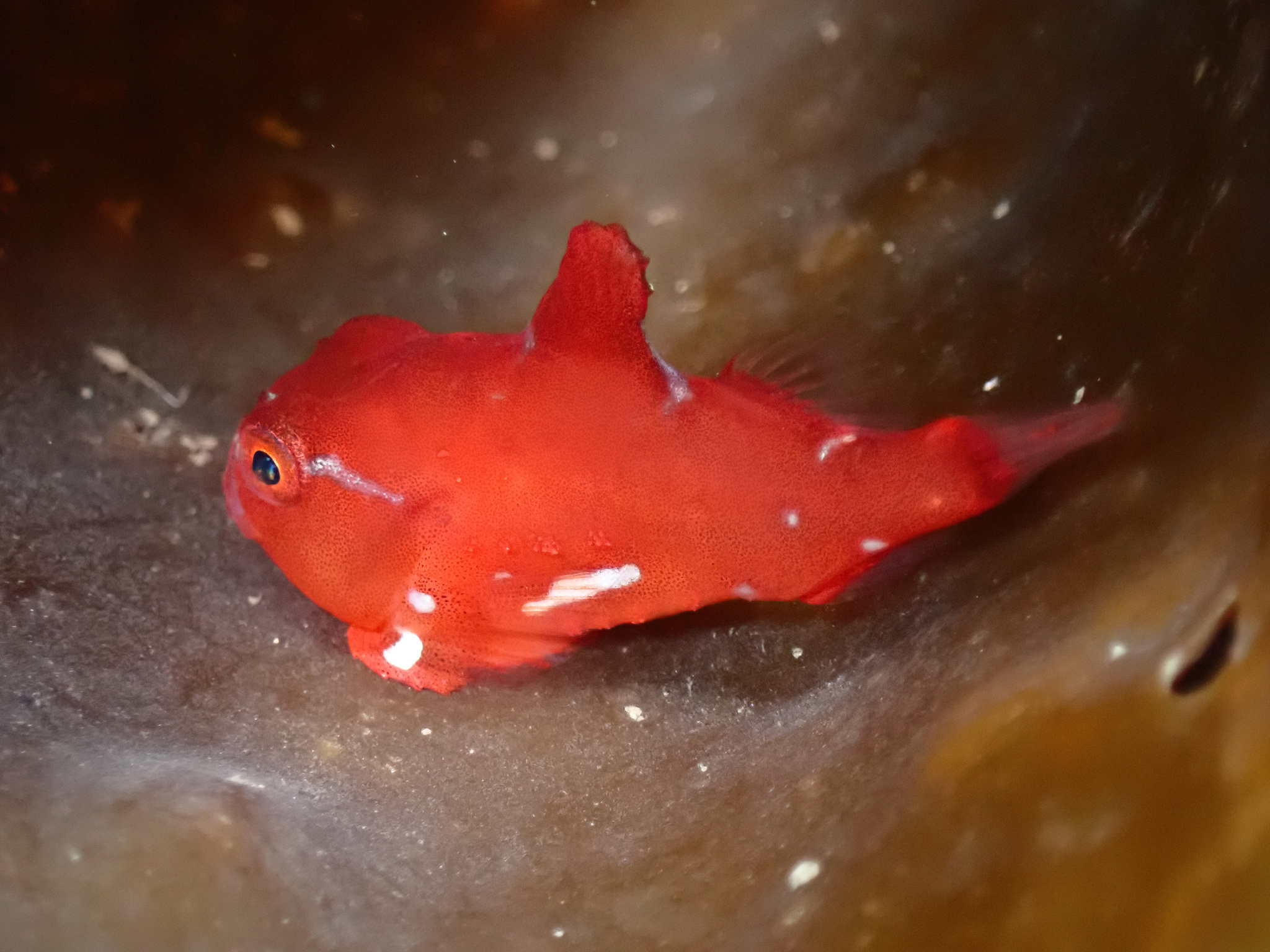

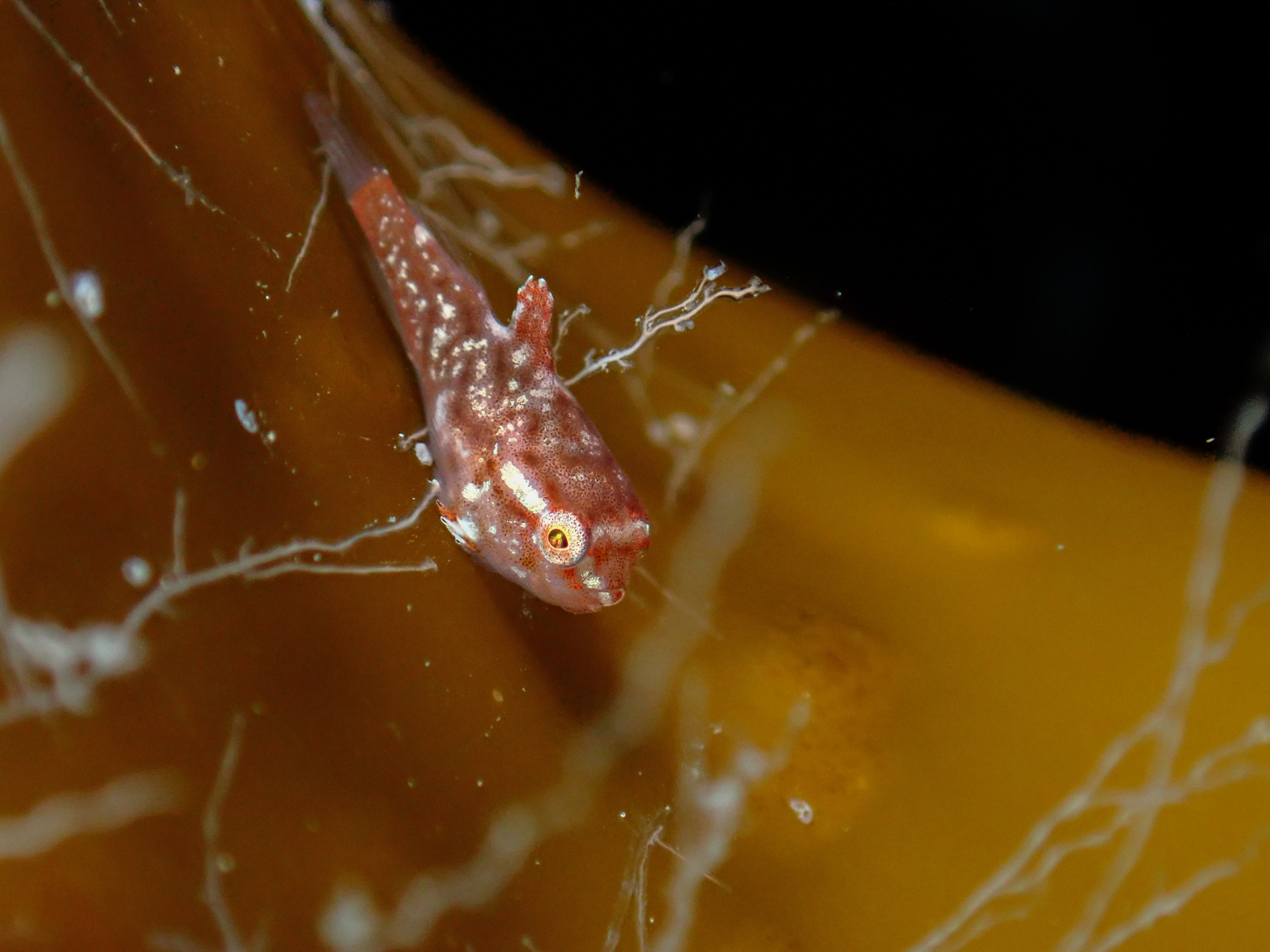

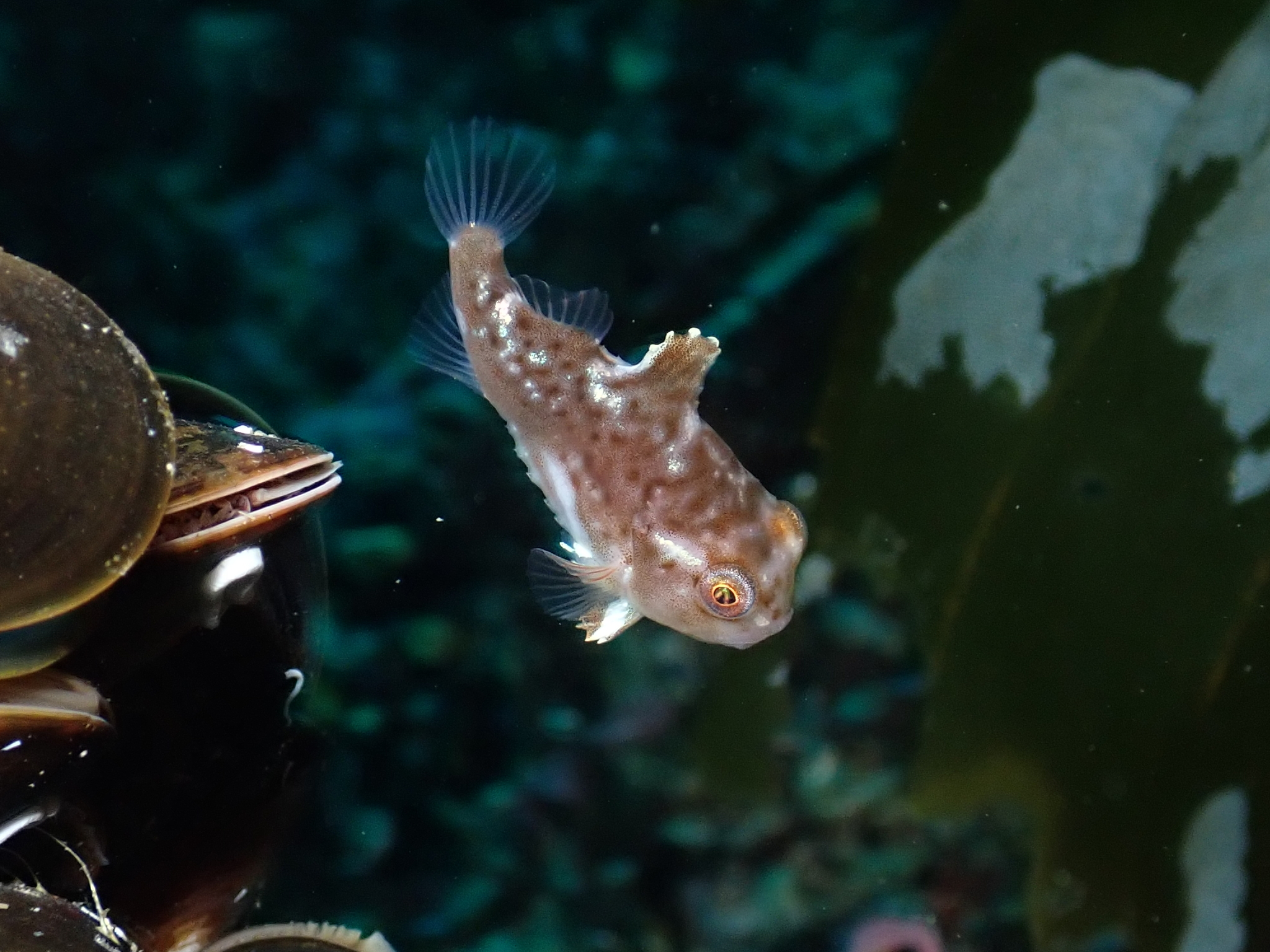

== Fishery ==
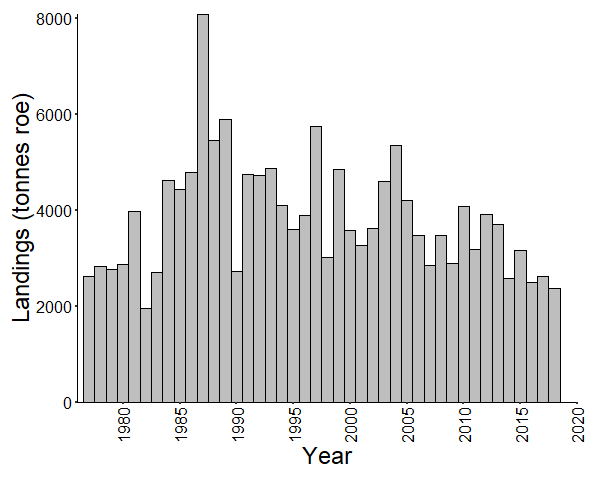
Total worldwide landings of lumpfish roe.

Cyclopterus is fished for its roe, landings of lumpfish roe varied from approximately 2,000–8,000 metric tons (2,200–8,800 short tons) from 1977 to 2018. In recent years, Iceland and Greenland have been the two largest fishing nations in regards to lumpfish and account for >95% of the global catch. Historically, Norway and Canada also contributed significant amounts but due to a decrease in the price of salted roe, and a severe population decline in Canada, the contribution from these countries has decreased. Denmark and Sweden have also contributed but the amount has been low in comparison with the other countries. Female fish are the main target for the fishery which utilizes the roe to make lumpfish caviar. Lumpfish are targeted close to the shore, where they come to spawn, using small fishing boats (generally less than 15 m or 49 ft) with large mesh gillnets. Due to the smaller size of the male, very few are caught in the large meshes. Traditionally, the roe would be removed at sea and the bodies disposed of. In Iceland, it is now mandatory for the bodies to be landed; these are now frozen and exported, mainly to China.

In Iceland, there is also the tradition of catching the male fish, mainly for the local market. This is done using gillnets with a smaller mesh size than that used for the females. The males are targeted in January–February, which is earlier than the females which are targeted from March until August.

== Population status ==
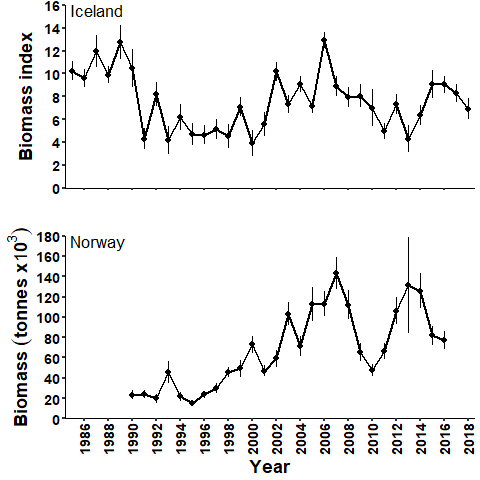
Biomass index of lumpfish around Iceland and in the Barents Sea (Norway) during 1985–2018. Data from the Marine and Freshwater Research Institute (Iceland) and Institute of Marine Research (Norway).

For Cyclopterus populations in both Iceland and Norway, the population is monitored using data from scientific surveys and is currently above the long term average and considered to be healthy. In Greenland, no survey data is available and data on fishing effort and landings are monitored. The time series is short for this population however appears to be stable. The population in Canada appears to be depleted and the Committee on the Status of Endangered Wildlife in Canada (COSEWIC) has classified this as threatened. There is a lack of data to reliably assess the abundance of lumpfish in the North Sea or Baltic Sea thus the population status of this area is unknown. The fishery in Greenland and Norway was certified by the Marine Stewardship Council in 2015 and 2017 respectively with these certifications being valid for 5 years. The fishery in Iceland was certified in 2014 but this was suspended in 2018 due to issues surrounding bycatch but regained certification in 2020.

== Uses ==
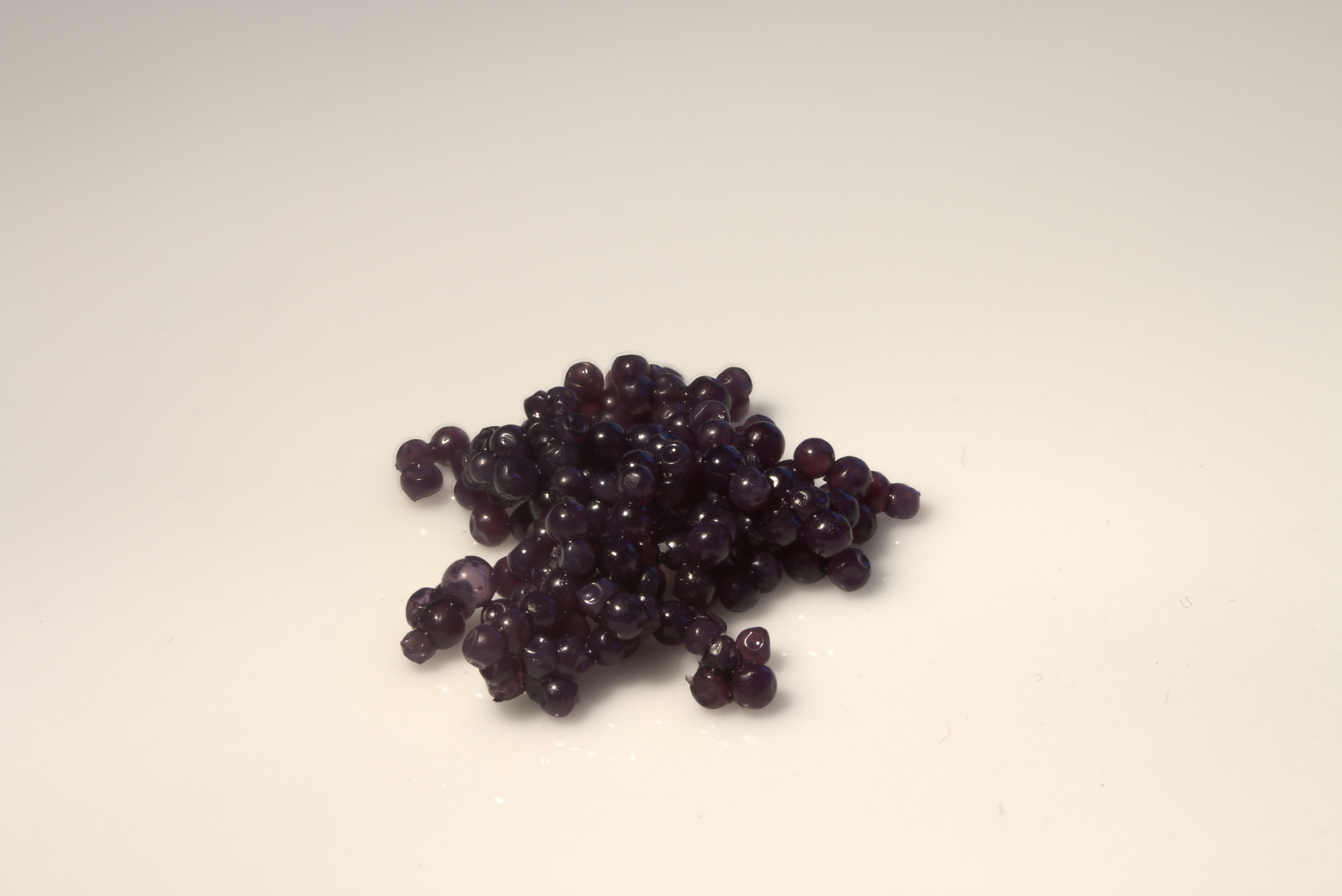
The caviar of the lumpfish

Cyclopterus roe, a good source of omega-3 fatty acids, is used to produce relatively inexpensive caviar substitutes. The roe is removed from the fish and processed to remove connective tissue. The roe is stored in large barrels where it is salted. The roe is dyed either red or black and packed with a mould inhibitor such as sodium benzoate (E211).

In Scandinavia the flesh of the fish is eaten. In Iceland, the males are often salted and smoked, or simply boiled. The female lumpfish is rarely eaten fresh but when it is caught during the spawning season, the guts and head removed, scored deeply with a knife and hung in a cool place until the flesh turns yellow. The fish is then poached before serving, as a dish called sigin grásleppa in Icelandic.

They are used as "cleaner fish" to reduce the parasite burden on salmon farms in Scotland, Iceland and Norway, and Canada.
