= Cyclopteropsis lindbergi =

Scientific classification
- Domain: Eukaryota
- Kingdom: Animalia
- Phylum: Chordata
- Class: Actinopterygii
- Order: Perciformes
- Suborder: Cottoidei
- Family: Cyclopteridae
- Genus: Cyclopteropsis
- Species: C. lindbergi

Binomial name
- Cyclopteropsis lindbergi Soldatov, 1930

Species of lumpfish

Cyclopteropsis lindbergi is a species of lumpfish native to the Bering Sea, the Sea of Okhotsk, and the Sea of Japan. It is found at a depth range of 20 to 200 m (66 to 656 ft), and it may reach 7 cm (2.8 inches) in total length.
