= Cyclopteropsis inarmatus =

Scientific classification
- Kingdom: Animalia
- Phylum: Chordata
- Class: Actinopterygii
- Order: Perciformes
- Suborder: Cottoidei
- Family: Cyclopteridae
- Genus: Cyclopteropsis
- Species: C. inarmatus

Binomial name
- Cyclopteropsis inarmatus Mednikov (ru) & Prokhorov, 1956

Species of fish

Cyclopteropsis inarmatus, also known as the bumpy lumpsucker, is a species of marine ray-finned fish belonging to the family Cyclopteridae, the lumpfishes or lumpsuckers. This fish is found in the North Pacific, where it occurs in the Bering Sea and the Sea of Okhotsk. In the Bering Sea, it can be found between Cape Navarin and Cape Olyutorskiy, whereas in the Sea of Okhotsk it is seen primarily off of the Kamchatka Peninsula. It inhabits a depth range of 76 to 150 m (249 to 492 ft) and reaches 6.4 cm (2.5 inches) in total length. It is a small demersal (bottom-dwelling) fish that may be seen in rocky areas.
