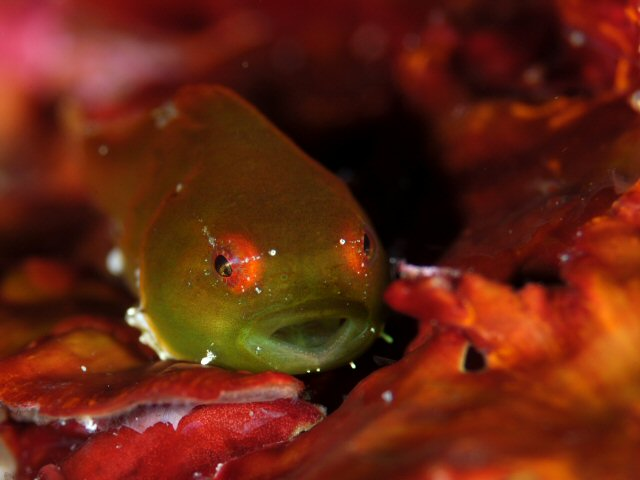

Conservation status
- Least Concern (IUCN 3.1)

Scientific classification
- Kingdom: Animalia
- Phylum: Chordata
- Class: Actinopterygii
- Order: Perciformes
- Suborder: Cottoidei
- Family: Cyclopteridae
- Genus: Eumicrotremus
- Species: E. awae

Binomial name
- Eumicrotremus awae (Jordan & Snyder, 1902)

Synonyms
- Lethotremus awae Jordan & Snyder, 1902

= Eumicrotremus awae =

Species of lumpfish

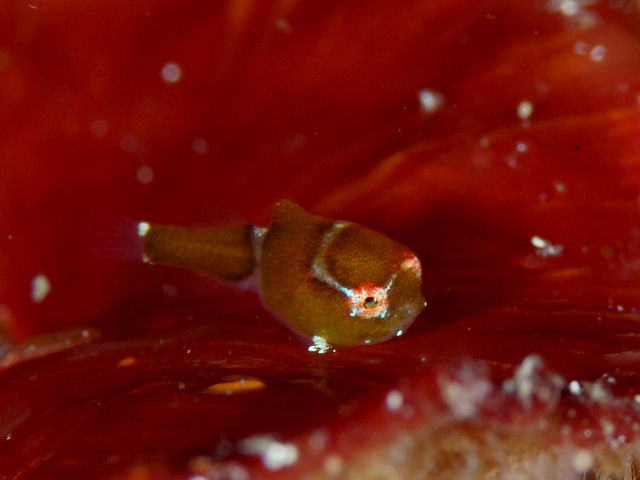
A young Eumicrotremus awae. Unlike the adults, these have prominent bands.

Eumicrotremus awae is a species of lumpfish endemic to the Pacific coast of Honshu, Japan, where it may be found from Chiba to Mie. E. awae is a very small fish, reaching a maximum of 2 cm (0.79 in) SL, and it occurs near shore at depths of less than 20 m (66 ft). This species is variable in color, being typically seen as either vibrant green or red. It is known to feed on extremely small crabs, and was previously known as Lethotremus awae until it was reclassified in 2017 following a taxonomic review and the descriptions of two similar "dwarf" species in Eumicrotremus.
