= Jean Bachelot La Pylaie =

French botanist, explorer and archaeologist (1786–1856)

Jean Marie Auguste Bachelot de La Pylaie
- Born: 25 May 1786; Fougères, Ille-et-Vilaine, France
- Died: 12 October 1856 (aged 70)
- Education: Laval, Muséum national d'histoire naturelle
- Known for: Botanical and archaeological explorations, first known collector of local species in Saint Pierre
- Scientific career
- Fields: Botany, exploration, archaeology
- Doctoral advisor: Georges Cuvier; Henri Marie Ducrotay de Blainville
- Author abbrev. (botany): Bach.Pyl.

Jean Marie Auguste Bachelot de La Pylaie (French: [ʒɑ̃ baʃlo la pilɛ]; 25 May 1786 in Fougères, Ille-et-Vilaine – 12 October 1856) was a French botanist, explorer and archaeologist.

He studied at Laval, and then in Paris at the Muséum national d'histoire naturelle, where he was a pupil of Georges Cuvier (1769–1832) and Henri Marie Ducrotay de Blainville (1777–1850).

He was a prolific explorer, mainly in France, but also in Africa and America, in particular the islands of Saint Pierre and Miquelon.

In 1816, sailing on the frigate Cybele, he surveyed St. George's Bay during a three months tour of Newfoundland and Saint Pierre and Miquelon. He was the first known collector of local species in Saint Pierre.

In December 1825, he began surveying the French islands of Hoëdic and Houat, to pursue his passion of collecting algae. In January 1826, instead of returning to the continent as he had originally planned, he stayed on the islands, having become fond of their inhabitants, and began to describe their lives, their activities, and the natural history of their environment.

He was the author of various archaeological studies on Brittany.
