= Compatibilization =

Adding a chemical substance to a mix of polymers to increase their stability

Thermodynamically, two polymers are fully miscible when the mixture's Gibbs free energy is negative, and the interfacial tension between the components is nearly zero, leading to a homogeneous, single-phase product. In practice, most polymers are largely immiscible, meaning their entropy is very low, and their interactions are strong. As a result, the blend often exhibits weak characteristics and poor mechanical performance.

In polymer chemistry, compatibilization is the addition of a substance to an immiscible blend of polymers that will increase their stability. Compatibilizing the system will make a more stable and better blended phase morphology by creating interactions between the two previously immiscible polymers. Not only does this enhance the mechanical properties of the blend, but it often yields properties that are generally not attainable in either single pure component.

== Block or graft copolymers as compatibilizing agents ==
Block or graft copolymers are commonly used as compatibilizing agents. The copolymer used is made of the two components in the immiscible blend. The respective portions of the copolymer are able to interact with the two phases of the blend to make the phase morphology more stable. The increased stability is caused by reducing the size of the phase-separated particles in the blend. The size reduction comes from the lower interfacial tension, due to accumulating block copolymers at the many interfaces between the two copolymers. This helps the immiscible blends break up into smaller particles in the melt phase. In turn, these phase separated particles will not be as inclined to consolidate and grow because the interfacial tension is now much lower. This stabilizes the polymer blend to a usable product. An example of this are Ethylene/propylene copolymers. They are able to act as good compatibilizing agents for blends of polypropylene and low density polyethylene. In this specific application, longer ethylene sequences are preferred in the copolymer. This is because cocrystallization also factors into this case, and the longer ethylene sequences will retain some residual crystallinity.

== Reactive compatibilization ==
Reactive compatibilization is a procedure in which immiscible polymer blends are compatibilized by creating copolymers in the solution or melt state. Copolymers are formed when the proper functional groups in each component of the immiscible blend interact in the compatibilization process. These interactions include hydrogen, ionic or covalent bonding. The functional groups that cause these interactions can be the end groups that are already present in the blend polymers (e.g., carboxylic acids or alcohols on polyesters, or amine groups on nylons). Another approach is to add functional groups to the component chains by grafting. The many possible functional groups allow for many types of commercial polymer blends, including polyamide/polyalkene blend systems. There are a number of advantages reactive compatibilization has over using the traditional block or graft copolymer as the compatibilizing agent. Unlike the latter approach, reactive compatibilization does not rely on diffusing pre-formed copolymers. Copolymers form at the interfaces of the two immiscible blends and do not need to be dispersed. In the traditional approach the system needs to be well mixed when adding the copolymers. Reactive compatibilization is also much more efficient than traditional compatibilization. This is because in reactive compatibilization, functional groups are either already present, or easily grafted on the blend components. In the traditional compatibilization, copolymers must be synthesized on a case-by-case basis for the components to blend.

== Compatibilization in mixed plastic waste recycling ==
A significant challenge in recycling is having mixed plastic fractions in the streams. A study indicated that nearly all waste plastic comprises various types of plastic, regardless of whether it is sorted with complete accuracy, and that polymer contamination exists at varying levels, dependent upon the heterogeneity of the packaging products within the relevant waste stream. Compatibilization facilitates the formation of a polymer blend without separating the plastic waste, which is found to be beneficial to increase the recycling rates.
