= Plasma polymerization =

Plasma polymerization (or glow discharge polymerization) uses plasma sources to generate a gas discharge that provides energy to activate or fragment gaseous or liquid monomer, often containing a vinyl group, in order to initiate polymerization. Polymers formed from this technique are generally highly branched and highly cross-linked, and adhere to solid surfaces well. The biggest advantage to this process is that polymers can be directly attached to a desired surface while the chains are growing, which reduces steps necessary for other coating processes such as grafting. This is very useful for pinhole-free coatings of 100 picometers to 1-micrometer thickness with solvent insoluble polymers.

== Introduction ==
In as early as the 1870s "polymers" formed by this process were known, but these polymers were initially thought of as undesirable byproducts associated with electric discharge, with little attention being given to their properties. It was not until the 1960s that the properties of these polymers were found to be useful. It was found that flawless thin polymeric coatings could be formed on metals, although for very thin films (<10 nm) this has recently been shown to be an oversimplification. By selecting the monomer type and the energy density per monomer, known as the Yasuda parameter, the chemical composition and structure of the resulting thin film can be varied with a wide range. These films are usually inert, adhesive, and have low dielectric constants. Some common monomers polymerized by this method include styrene, ethylene, methacrylate, and pyridine, just to name a few. The 1970s brought about many advances in plasma polymerization, including the polymerization of many different types of monomers. The mechanisms of deposition however were largely ignored until more recently. Since this time most attention devoted to plasma polymerization has been in the fields of coatings, but since it is difficult to control polymer structure, it has limited applications.

== Basic operating mechanism ==
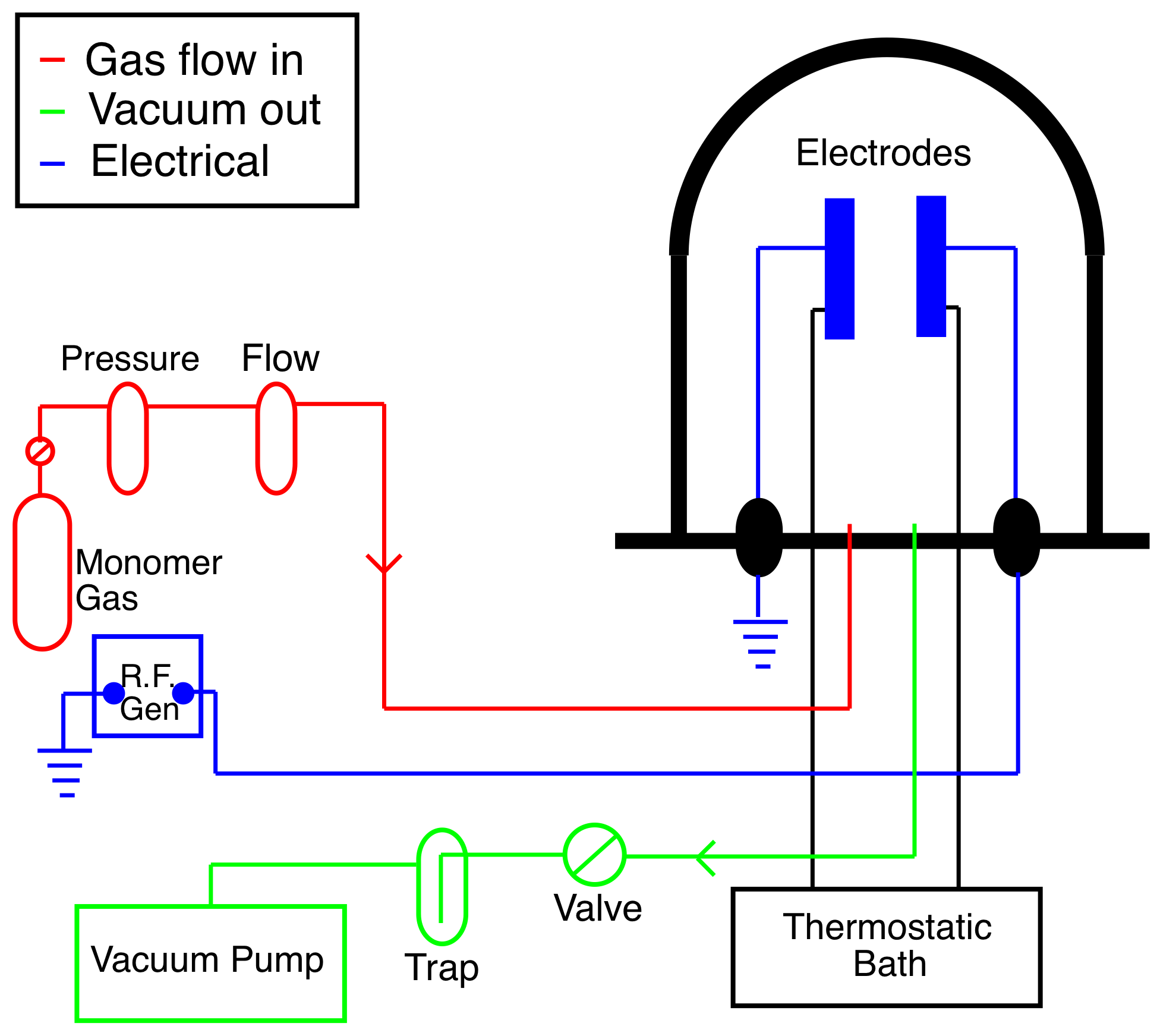
Figure 1. Schematic representation of basic internal electrode glow discharge polymerization apparatus

=== Glow discharge ===
Plasma consists of a mixture of electrons, ions, radicals, neutrals, and photons. Some of these species are in local thermodynamic equilibrium, while others are not. Even for simple gases like argon, this mixture can be complex. For plasmas of organic monomers, the complexity can rapidly increase as some components of the plasma fragment, while others interact and form larger species. Glow discharge is a technique in polymerization which forms free electrons which gain energy from an electric field, and then lose energy through collisions with neutral molecules in the gas phase. This leads to many chemically reactive species, which then leads to a plasma polymerization reaction. The electric discharge process for plasma polymerization is the "low-temperature plasma" method because higher temperatures cause degradation. These plasmas are formed by a direct current, alternating current or radio frequency generator.

=== Types of reactors ===
There are a few designs for apparatus used in plasma polymerization, one of which is the Bell (static type), in which monomer gas is put into the reaction chamber, but does not flow through the chamber. It comes in and polymerizes without removal. This type of reactor is shown in Figure 1. This reactor has internal electrodes, and polymerization commonly takes place on the cathode side. All devices contain the thermostatic bath, which is used to regulate temperature, and a vacuum to regulate pressure.

Operation: The monomer gas comes into the Bell-type reactor as a gaseous species, and then is put into the plasma state by the electrodes, in which the plasma may consist of radicals, anions and cations. These monomers are then polymerized on the cathode surface, or some other surface placed in the apparatus by different mechanisms of which details are discussed below. The deposited polymers then propagate off the surface and form growing chains with seemingly uniform consistency.

Another popular reactor type is the flow-through reactor (continuous flow reactor), which also has internal electrodes, but this reactor allows monomer gas to flow through the reaction chamber as its name implies, which should give a more even coating for polymer film deposition. It has the advantage that more monomer keeps flowing into the reactor to deposit more polymer. It has the disadvantage of forming what is called "tail flame", which is when polymerization extends into the vacuum line.

A third popular type of reactor is the electrodeless. This uses an RF coil wrapped around the glass apparatus, which then uses a radio frequency generator to form the plasma inside of the housing without the use of direct electrodes (see Inductively Coupled Plasma). The polymer can then be deposited as it is pushed through this RF coil toward the vacuum end of the apparatus. This has the advantage of not having polymer building up on the electrode surface, which is desirable when polymerizing onto other surfaces.

A fourth type of system growing in popularity is the atmospheric-pressure plasma system, which is useful for depositing thin polymer films. This system bypasses the requirements for special hardware involving vacuums, which then makes it favorable for integrated industrial use. It has been shown that polymers formed at atmospheric pressure can have similar properties for coatings as those found in low-pressure systems.

=== Physical process characteristics ===
The formation of plasma for polymerization depends on many of the following. An electron energy of 1–10 eV is required, with electron densities of 10^{9} to 10^{12} per cubic centimeter, to form the desired plasma state. The formation of a low-temperature plasma is important; the electron temperatures are not equal to the gas temperatures and have a ratio of T_{e}/T_{g} of 10 to 100, so that this process can occur at near ambient temperatures, which is advantageous because polymers degrade at high temperatures, so if a high-temperature plasma was used the polymers would degrade after formation or would never be formed. This entails non-equilibrium plasmas, which means that charged monomer species have more kinetic energy than neutral monomer species, and cause the transfer of energy to a substrate instead of an uncharged monomer.

=== Kinetics ===
The kinetic rate of these reactions depends mostly on the monomer gas, which must be either gaseous or vaporized. However, other parameters are also important as well, such as power, pressure, flow rate, frequency, electrode gap, and reactor configuration. Low flow rates usually only depend on the number of reactive species present for polymerization, whereas high flow rates depend on the amount of time that is spent in the reactor. Therefore, the maximum rate of polymerization is somewhere in the middle.

The fastest reactions tend to be in the order of triple-bonded > double-bonded > single bonded molecules, and also lower molecular weight molecules are faster than higher ones. So acetylene is faster than ethylene, and ethylene is faster than propene, etc. The molecular weight factor in polymer deposition is dependent on the monomer flow rate, in which a higher molecular weight monomer typically near 200 g/mol needs a much higher flow rate of 15×10^{4} g/cm^{2}, whereas lower molecular weights around 50 g/mol require a flow rate of only 5×10^{4} g/cm^{2}. A heavy monomer, therefore, needs a faster flow, and would likely lead to increased pressures, decreasing polymerization rates.

Increased pressure tends to decrease polymerization rates reducing uniformity of deposition since uniformity is controlled by constant pressure. This is a reason that high-pressure plasma or atmospheric-pressure plasmas are not usually used in favor of low-pressure systems. At pressures greater than 1 torr, oligomers is formed on the electrode surface, and the monomers also on the surface can dissolve them to get a low degree of polymerization forming an oily substance. At low pressures, the reactive surfaces are low in monomer and facilitate the growth of high molecular weight polymers.

The rate of polymerization depends on input power, until power saturation occurs and the rate becomes independent of it. A narrower electrode gap also tends to increase polymerization rates because a higher electron density per unit area is formed. Polymerization rates also depend on the type of apparatus used for the process. In general, increasing the frequency of alternating current glow discharge up to about 5 kHz increases the rate due to the formation of more free radicals. After this frequency, the inertial effects of colliding monomers inhibit polymerization. This forms the first plateau for polymerization frequencies. A second maximum in frequency occurs at 6 MHz, where side reactions are overcome again and the reaction occurs through free radicals diffused from plasma to the electrodes, at which point a second plateau is obtained. These parameters differ slightly for each monomer and must be optimized in-situ.

== Synthetic routes ==
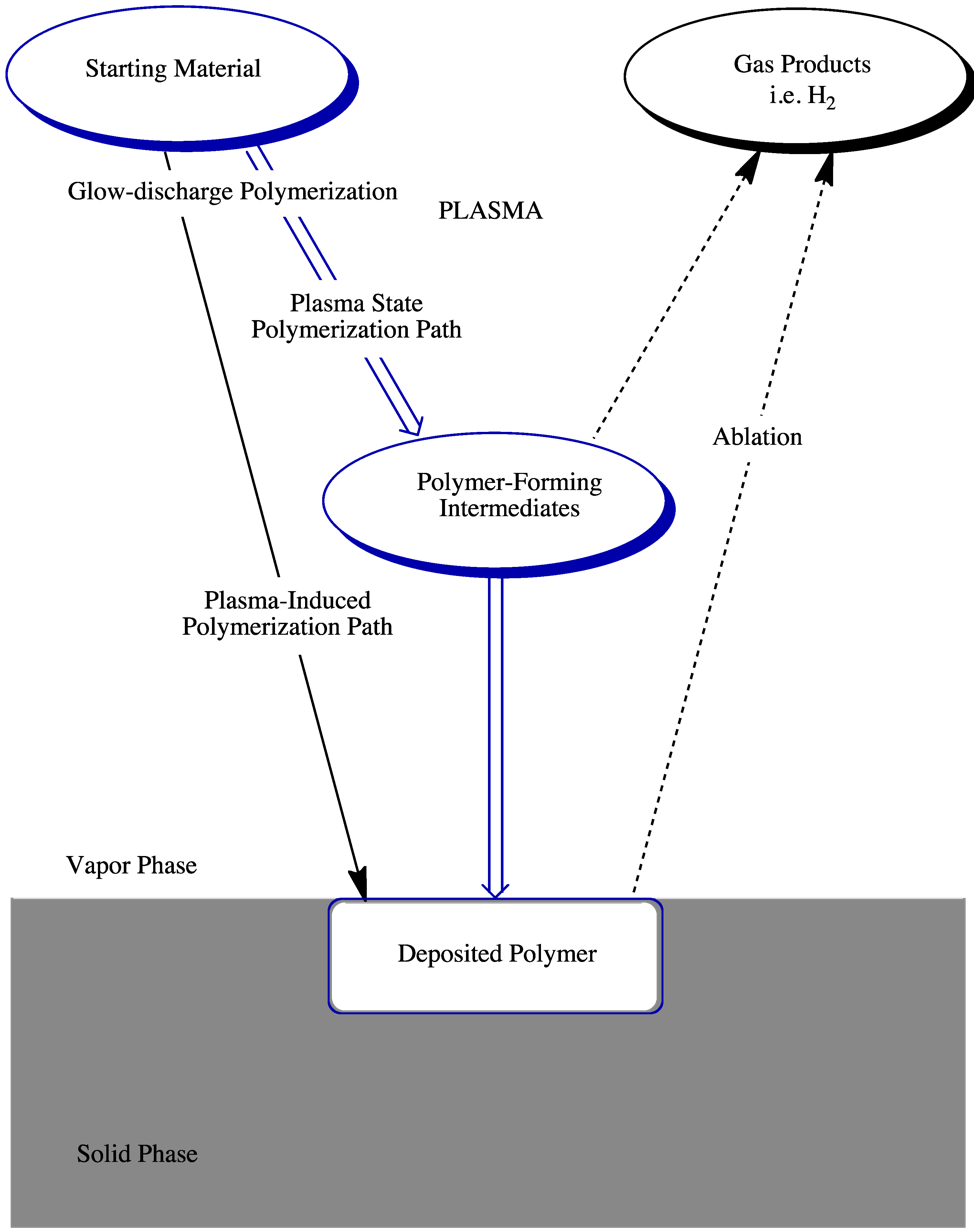
Figure 2. Schematic of plasma polymerization process possibilities, w/blue representing dominant pathway.

Plasma contains many species such as ions, free radicals, and electrons, so it is important to look at what contributes to the polymerization process most. The first suggested process by Westwood et al. was that of a cationic polymerization since in a direct current system polymerization occurs mainly on the cathode. However, more investigation has led to the belief that the mechanism is more of a radical polymerization process, since radicals tend to be trapped in the films, and termination can be overcome by reinitiation of oligomers. Other kinetic studies also appear to support this theory.

However, since the mid-1990s several papers focusing on the formation of highly functionalized plasma polymers have postulated a more significant role for cations, particularly where the plasma sheath is collisionless. The assumption that the plasma ion density is low and consequently the ion flux to surfaces is low has been challenged, pointing out that ion flux is determined according to the Bohm sheath criterion i.e. ion flux is proportional to the square root of the electron temperature and not RT.

In polymerization, both gas phase and surface reactions occur, but the mechanism differs between high and low frequencies. At high frequencies, it occurs in reactive intermediates, whereas at low frequencies polymerization happens mainly on surfaces. As polymerization occurs, the pressure inside the chamber decreases in a closed system, since gas-phase monomers go to solid polymers. An example diagram of the ways that polymerization can take place is shown in Figure 2, wherein the most abundant pathway is shown in blue with double arrows, with side pathways shown in black. The ablation occurs by gas formation during polymerization. Polymerization has two pathways, either the plasma state or plasma-induced processes, which both lead to the deposited polymer.

Polymers can be deposited on many substrates other than the electrode surfaces, such as glass, other organic polymers, or metals, when either a surface is placed in front of the electrodes, or placed in the middle between them. The ability for them to build off of electrode surfaces is likely to be an electrostatic interaction, while on other surfaces covalent attachment is possible.

Polymerization is likely to take place through either ionic and/or radical processes which are initiated by plasma formed from the glow discharge. The classic view presented by Yasuda based upon thermal initiation of Parylene polymerization is that there are many propagating species present at any given time as shown in Figure 3. This figure shows two different pathways by which the polymerization may take place.

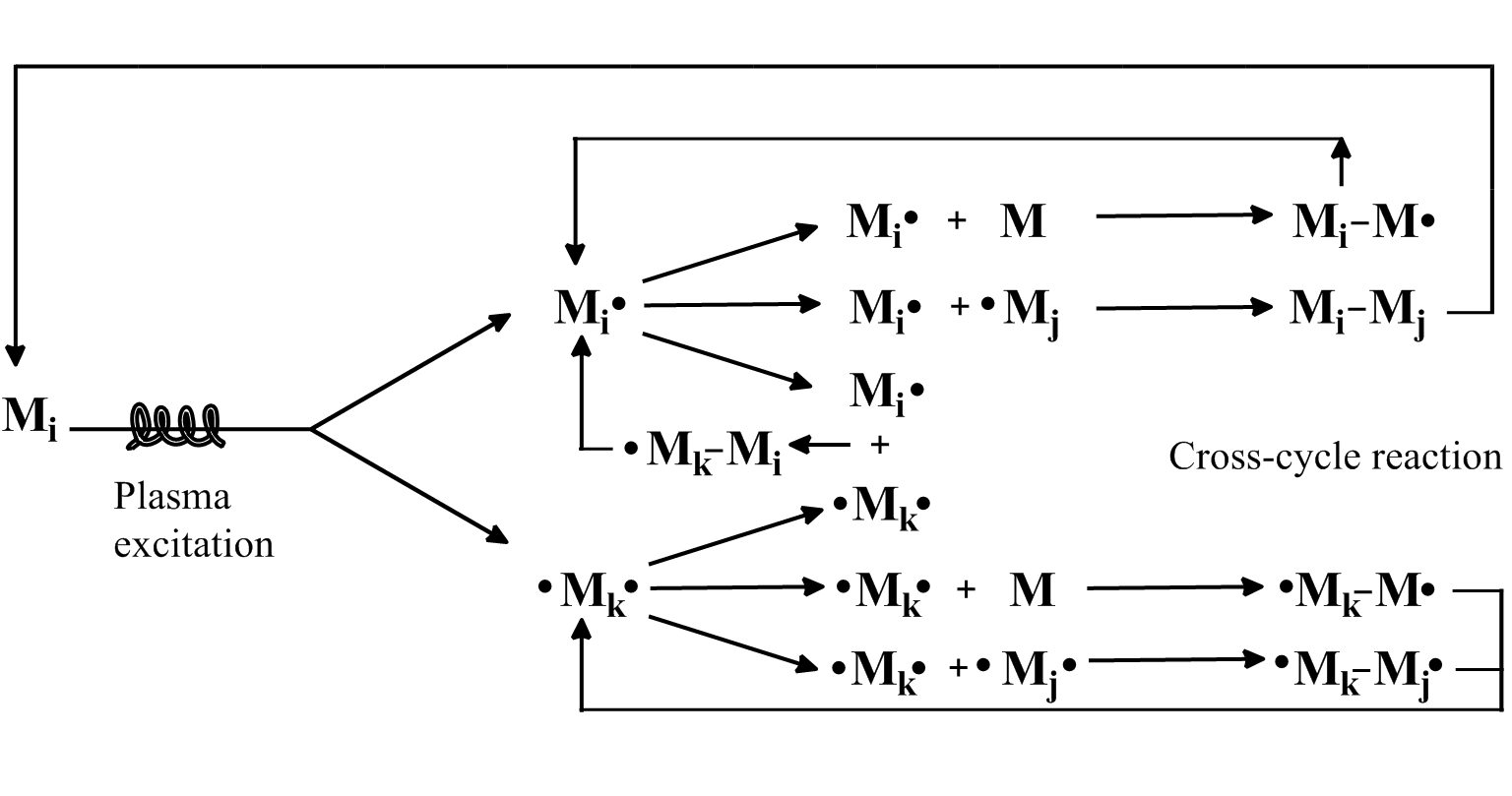
Figure 3. Schematic representation of the bicyclic step-growth mechanism of plasma polymerization.

The first pathway is a monofunctionalization process, which bears resemblance to a standard free radical polymerization mechanism (M•)- although with the caveat that the reactive species may be ionic and not necessarily radical. The second pathway refers to a difunctional mechanism, which for example may contain a cationic and a radical propagating center on the same monomer (•M•). A consequence is that 'polymer' can grow in multiple directions by multiple pathways off one species, such as a surface or other monomer. This possibility let Yasuda to term the mechanism as a very rapid step-growth polymerization. In the diagram, M_{x} refers to the original monomer molecule or any of many dissociation products such as chlorine, fluorine and hydrogen. The M• species refers to those that are activated and capable of participating in reactions to form new covalent bonds. The •M• species refers to an activated difunctional monomer species. The subscripts i, j, and k show the sizes of the different species involved. Even though radicals represent the activated species, any ion or radical could be used in the polymerization. As can be seen here, plasma polymerization is a very complex process, with many parameters affecting everything from rate to chain length.

Selection or the favoring of one particular pathway can be achieved by altering the plasma parameters. For example, pulsed plasma with selected monomers appears to favor much more regular polymer structures and it has been postulated these grow by a mechanism akin to (radical) chain growth in the plasma off-time.

== Common monomers/polymers ==
Common monomers
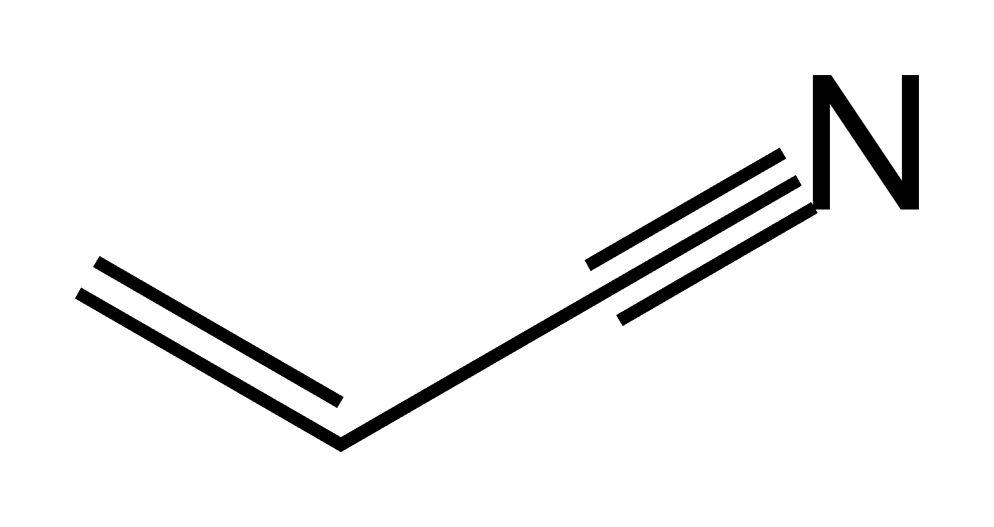
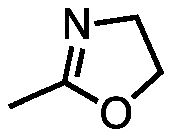
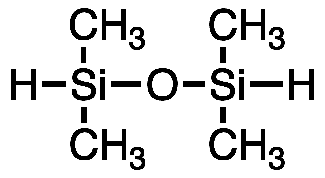
Name	Structure
Thiophene
1,7-Octadiene
Pyridine
Acrylonitrile
Furan
Styrene
Acetylene
2-Methyloxazoline
Tetramethyldisiloxane

=== Monomers ===
As can be seen in the monomer table, many simple monomers are readily polymerized by this method, but most must be smaller ionizable species because they have to be able to go into the plasma state. Though monomers with multiple bonds polymerize readily, it is not a requirement, as ethane, silicones and many others polymerize also. Other stipulations exist. Yasuda et al. studied 28 monomers and found that those containing aromatic groups, silicon, olefinic group or nitrogen (NH, NH_{2}, CN) were readily polymerizable, while those containing oxygen, halides, aliphatic hydrocarbons and cyclic hydrocarbons were decomposed more readily. The latter compounds have more ablation or side reactions present, which inhibit stable polymer formation. It is also possible to incorporate N_{2}, H_{2}O, and CO into copolymers of styrene.

Plasma polymers can be thought of as a type of graft polymer since they are grown off of a substrate. These polymers are known to form nearly uniform surface deposition, which is one of their desirable properties. Polymers formed from this process often cross-link and form branches due to the multiple propagating species present in the plasma. This often leads to very insoluble polymers, which gives an advantage to this process, since hyperbranched polymers can be deposited directly without solvent.

=== Polymers ===
Common polymers include: polythiophene, polyhexafluoropropylene, polytetramethyltin, polyhexamethyldisiloxane, polytetramethyldisiloxane, polypyridine, polyfuran, and poly-2-methyloxazoline.

The following are listed in order of decreasing rate of polymerization: polystyrene, polymethyl styrene, polycyclopentadiene, polyacrylate, polymethyl acrylate, polymethyl methacrylate, polyvinyl acetate, polyisoprene, polyisobutene, and polyethylene.

Nearly all polymers created by this method have excellent appearance, are clear, and are significantly cross-linked. Linear polymers are not formed readily by plasma polymerization methods based on propagating species. Many other polymers could be formed by this method.

== General characteristics of plasma polymers ==
The properties of plasma polymers differ greatly from those of conventional polymers. While both types are dependent on the chemical properties of the monomer, the properties of plasma polymers depend more greatly on the design of the reactor and the chemical and physical characteristics of the substrate on which the plasma polymer is deposited. The location within the reactor where the deposition occurs also affects the resultant polymer's properties. In fact, by using plasma polymerization with a single monomer and varying the reactor, substrate, etc. a variety of polymers, each having different physical and chemical properties, can be prepared. The large dependence of the polymer features on these factors makes it difficult to assign a set of basic characteristics, but a few common properties that set plasma polymers apart from conventional polymers do exist.

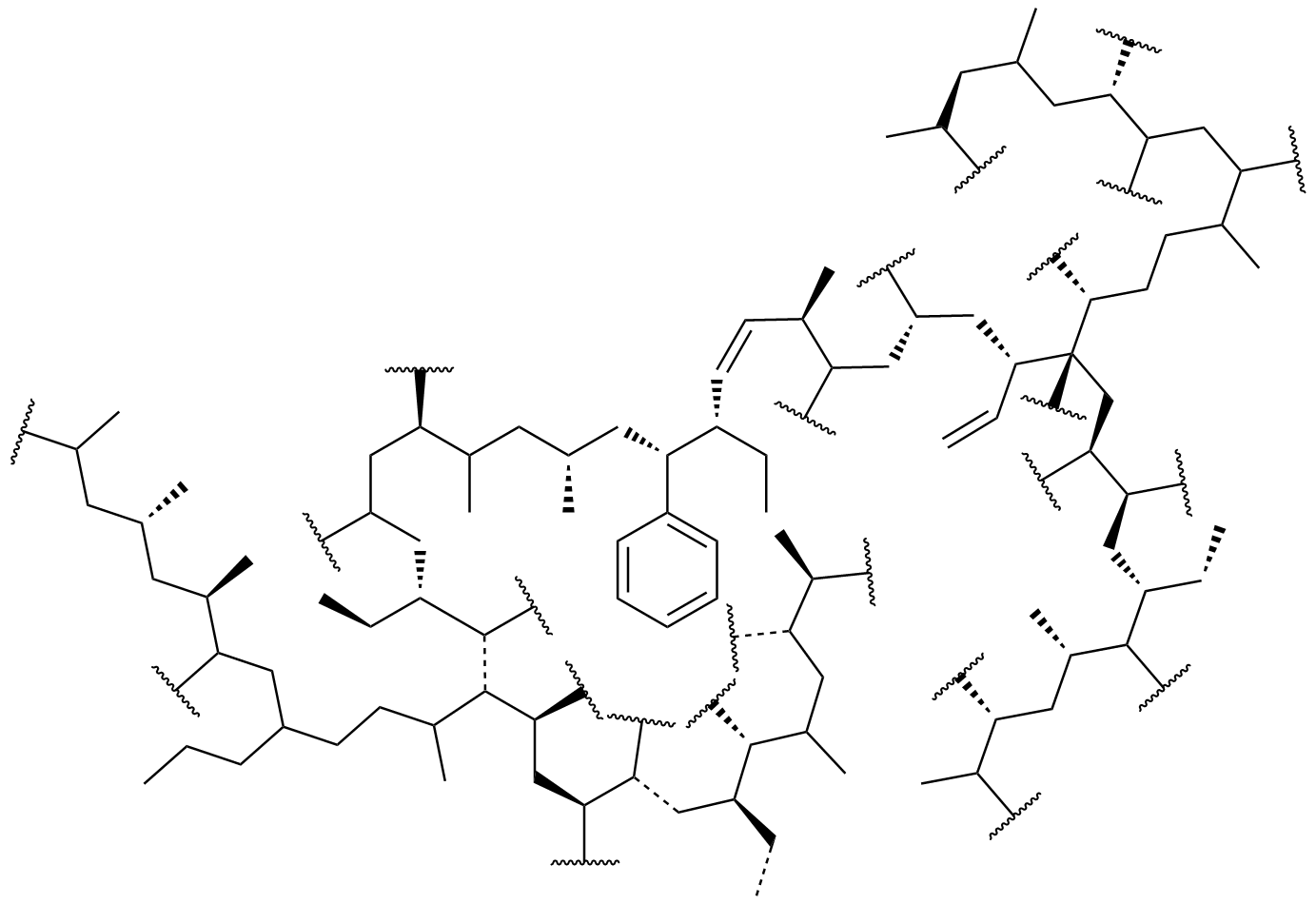
Figure 4. Hypothesized model of plasma-polymerized ethylene film.

The most significant difference between conventional polymers and plasma polymers is that plasma polymers do not contain regular repeating units. Due to the number of different propagating species present at any one time as discussed above, the resultant polymer chains are highly branched and are randomly terminated with a high degree of cross-linking. An example of a proposed structure for plasma polymerized ethylene demonstrating a large extend of cross-linking and branching is shown in Figure 4.

All plasma polymers contain free radicals as well. The amount of free radicals present varies between polymers and is dependent on the chemical structure of the monomer. Because the formation of the trapped free radicals is tied to the growth mechanism of the plasma polymers, the overall properties of the polymers directly correlate to the number of free radicals.

Plasma polymers also contain internal stress. If a thick layer (e.g. 1 µm) of a plasma polymer is deposited on a glass slide, the plasma polymer will buckle and frequently crack. The curling is attributed to an internal stress formed in the plasma polymer during the polymer deposition. The degree of curling is dependent on the monomer as well as the conditions of the plasma polymerization.

Most plasma polymers are insoluble and infusible. These properties are due to the large amount of cross-linking in the polymers, previously discussed. Consequently, the kinetic path length for these polymers must be sufficiently long, so these properties can be controlled to a point.

The permeabilities of plasma polymers also differ greatly from those of conventional polymers. Because of the absence of large-scale segmental mobility and the high degree of cross-linking within the polymers, the permeation of small molecules does not strictly follow the typical mechanisms of "solution-diffusion" or molecular-level sieve for such small permeants. The permeability characteristics of plasma polymers fall between these two ideal cases.

A final common characteristic of plasma polymers is the adhesion ability. The specifics of the adhesion ability for a given plasma polymer, such as thickness and characteristics of the surface layer, again are particular for a given plasma polymer and few generalizations can be made.

== Advantages and disadvantages ==
Plasma polymerization offers several advantages over other polymerization methods in general. The most significant advantage of plasma polymerization is its ability to produce polymer films of organic compounds that do not polymerize under normal chemical polymerization conditions. Nearly all monomers, even saturated hydrocarbons and organic compounds without a polymerizable structure such as a double bond, can be polymerized with this technique.

A second advantage is the ease of application of the polymers as coatings versus conventional coating processes. While coating a substrate with conventional polymers requires several steps, plasma polymerization accomplishes all these in essentially a single step. This leads to a cleaner and 'greener' synthesis and coating process since no solvent is needed during the polymer preparation and no cleaning of the resultant polymer is needed either. Another 'green' aspect of the synthesis is that no initiator is needed for the polymer preparation since reusable electrodes cause the reaction to proceed. The resultant polymer coatings also have several advantages over typical coatings. These advantages include being nearly pinhole-free, highly dense, and the thickness of the coating can easily be varied.

There are also several disadvantages relating to plasma polymerization versus conventional methods. The most significant disadvantage is the high cost of the process. A vacuum system is required for the polymerization, significantly increasing the set-up price.

Another disadvantage is due to the complexity of plasma processes. Because of the complexity, it is not easy to achieve good control over the chemical composition of the surface after modification. The influence of process parameters on the chemical composition of the resultant polymer means it can take a long time to determine the optimal conditions. The complexity of the process also makes it impossible to theorize what the resultant polymer will look like, unlike conventional polymers which can be easily determined based on the monomer.

== Applications ==
The advantages offered by plasma polymerization have resulted in substantial research on the applications of these polymers. The vastly different chemical and mechanical properties offered by polymers formed with plasma polymerization means they can be applied to countless different systems. Applications ranging from adhesion, composite materials, protective coatings, printing, membranes, biomedical applications, water purification, and so on have all been studied.

Of particular interest since the 1980s has been the deposition of functionalized plasma polymer films. For example, functionalized films are used as a means of improving biocompatibility for biological implants6 and for producing super-hydrophobic coatings. They have also been extensively employed in biomaterials for cell attachment, protein binding, and anti-fouling surfaces. Through the use of low-power and pressure plasma, high functional retention can be achieved which has led to substantial improvements in the biocompatibility of some products, a simple example being the development of extended-wear contact lenses. Due to these successes, the huge potential of functional plasma polymers is slowly being realized by workers in previously unrelated fields such as water treatment and wound management. Emerging technologies such as nanopatterning, 3D scaffolds, micro-channel coating, and microencapsulation are now also utilizing functionalized plasma polymers, areas for which traditional polymers are often unsuitable

A significant area of research has been on the use of plasma polymer films as permeation membranes. The permeability characteristics of plasma polymers deposited on porous substrates are different than usual polymer films. The characteristics depend on the deposition and polymerization mechanism. Plasma polymers as membranes for separation of oxygen and nitrogen, ethanol and water, and water vapor permeation have all been studied. The application of plasma polymerized thin films as reverse osmosis membranes has received considerable attention as well. Yasuda et al. have shown membranes prepared with plasma polymerization made from nitrogen-containing monomers can yield up to 98% salt rejection with a flux of 6.4 gallons/ft^{2} a day. Further research has shown that varying the monomers of the membrane offers other properties as well, such as chlorine resistance.

Plasma-polymerized films have also found electrical applications. Given that plasma polymers frequently contain many polar groups, which form when the radicals react with oxygen in the air during the polymerization process, the plasma polymers were expected to be good dielectric materials in thin film form. Studies have shown that plasma polymers generally do have a higher dielectric property. Some plasma polymers have been applied as chemical sensory devices due to their electrical properties. Plasma polymers have been studied as chemical sensory devices for humidity, propane, and carbon dioxide amongst others. Thus far issues with instability against aging and humidity have limited their commercial applications.

The application of plasma polymers as coatings has also been studied. Plasma polymers formed from tetramethoxysilane have been studied as protective coatings and have been shown to increase the hardness of polyethylene and polycarbonate. The use of plasma polymers to coat plastic lenses is increasing in popularity. Plasma depositions can easily coat curved materials with good uniformity, such as those of bifocals. The different plasma polymers used can be not only scratch resistant but also hydrophobic leading to anti-fogging effects. Plasma polymer surfaces with tunable wettability and reversibly switchable pH-responsiveness have shown promising prospects due to their unique property in applications, such as drug delivery, biomaterial engineering, oil/water separation processes, sensors, and biofuel cells.
