= Sequence-defined polymer =

Sequence-defined polymer (Syn. sequence-specific polymer, sequence-ordered polymer) is a uniform macromolecule with an exact chain-length and a perfectly defined sequence of monomers. In other words, each monomer unit is at a defined position in the chain e.g. peptides, proteins, oligonucleotides. Sequence-defined polymers constitute therefore a subclass of the field of sequence-controlled polymers.
