= Pervaded volume =

Pervaded volume is a measure of the size of a polymer chain in space. In particular, it is "the volume of solution spanned by the polymer chain".

== Scaling ==
The pervaded volume V scales as the cube of the chain size

$V \approx R^3$

R is some length scale describing the chain conformation such as the radius of gyration or root-mean-square end-to-end distance of the chain. Typically the pervaded volume is very large relative to the space actually occupied by the chain as most of the pervaded volume is usually filled with solvent or other chains.

== Applications ==
Chain pervaded volume is relevant in the morphology and rheology of melt and bulk polymers through its relation to quantities such as the interchain entanglement density, the number of entanglements between different chains per volume.

== See also ==
- Radius of Gyration
- Coil-globule transition
- Excluded volume
