= Polyfuran =

- Idealized chemical structure of polyfuran

Identifiers
CAS Number	25067-54-3

Properties
Chemical formula	(C_{4}H_{2}O)_{n}
- Except where otherwise noted, data are given for materials in their standard state (at 25 °C [77 °F], 100 kPa). Infobox references

Polyfuran (PFu) is a polymer that consists of multiple furanylene rings. Such materials are of interest for their potential in molecular electronics, although much less studied than polythiophenes and polypyrroles. Polyfuran is distinct from furan resins, a class of non-conjugated polymers. Furan resins are of commercial interest, in contrast to polyfuran.

Polyfurans can be prepared by electrochemical approaches. The mechanism of polymerization is proposed to involve radical cation intermediates, i.e. species with the formula C_{4}R_{4}O^{+}.

Polyfurans can also be produced using acid catalysts. Radical polymerization has also been explored, and oxidative cationic polymerization.
