= Reactive compatibilization =

Reactive compatibilization is the process of modifying a mixed immiscible blend of polymers to arrest phase separation and allow for the formation of a stable, long-term continuous phase. It is done via the addition of a reactive polymer, miscible with one blend component and reactive towards functional groups on the second component, which result in the "in-situ" formation of block or grafted copolymers.

A large number of commercial polymeric products are derived from the blending of two or more polymers to achieve a favorable balance of physical properties. However, since most polymer blends are immiscible, it is rare to find a pair of polymers that both are miscible and have desired characteristics. An example of such pair is the miscible resin NORYL™, a mix of poly(phenylene oxide) and polystyrene. Immiscible blends will phase separate and form a dispersed phase, which may improve physical properties (figure 1). DuPont's rubber toughened Nylon consists of small particles of poly(cis-isoprene) (natural rubber) in a Nylon matrix that toughen the material by arresting crack propagation.

== Miscibility of Polymer Blends ==
The Gibbs free energy of mixing, $\Delta G_(mix)= \Delta H_(mix)-T\Delta S_(mix)$, must be negative for a blend to be miscible. According to Flory-Huggins theory, a revision of regular solution theory, the entropy change per mole of lattice sites of blending polymer 1 and polymer 2 is

$\Delta S_(mix,blend) = -R \left({\phi_1\over x_1}\ln \phi_1 + {\phi_2\over x_2}\ln \phi_2 \right)$

, where ΔS is the change in entropy of mixing, R is the gas constant, Φ is the volume fraction of each polymer, and x is the number of segments of each polymer. x_{1} and x_{2} increase with higher degrees of polymerization and thus molecular weight. Since most useful polymers are high in molecular weight, the change in entropy experienced from the mixing of two large polymer chains is very low, and typically does not bring the Gibbs free energy low enough to constitute miscibility.

== Compatibilization ==
Most processed polymer mixes consist of a dispersed phase in a more continuous matrix of the other component. The formation, size, and concentration of this disperse phase are typically optimized for specific mechanical properties. If the morphology is not stabilized, the dispersed phase may coalesce under heat or stress from the environment or further processing. This coalescence may result in diminished properties (brittleness and discoloration) due to the induced phase separation. These morphologies can be stabilized by sufficient interfacial adhesion or lowered interfacial tension between the two phases.

A common technique involves functionalizing one monomer. For example, Nylon-rubber bands are polymerized with functionalized rubber to produce graft or block copolymers. The added structures make it no longer favorable to coalesce and/or increase the steric hindrance in the interfacial area where phase separation would occur.
