= Topical gels =

Topical drug delivery dosage form

Topical gels are a topical drug delivery dosage form commonly used in cosmetics and treatments for skin diseases because of their advantages over cream and ointment. They are formed from a mixture of gelator, solvent, active drug, and other excipients, and can be classified into organogels and hydrogels. Drug formulation and preparation methods depend on the properties of the gelators, solvents, drug and excipients used.

== Structure of gels ==
Illustration of a colloid gel (3d model)

A gel refers to the semi-solid, 3-dimensional matrix formed from an interspersed system of colloidal particles or the permeation of a solvent into an entwined polymer chain network. Pharmaceutical gels are formed by adding a gelator (gelling agent) to the solvent and active ingredient mixture.

Gelators used in gel formulation can be small molecules with low molecular weight or polymers (synthetic, semi-synthetic or natural). The solvent that is used as a dispersion medium can be aqueous, organic, inorganic, or a system of different solvents.

Topical gels are used as a contact or transport medium for active drugs to act on or through the skin. The active drug molecules are entwined into the 3D mesh of the gel and delivered to the site of action.

== Characteristics ==
Gels have certain special properties that put them apart from other dosage forms, in terms of swelling, syneresis, ageing, rigidity and rheology.

== Classification ==
Gels can be classified through a variety of criteria such as their nature of the colloidal phase, nature of the solvent used and physical nature.

=== Nature of solvent classification ===
This is the most widely used classification of gels. They are classified into two main groups by the nature of the solvent: organogels and hydrogels.

==== Organogels ====
Organogels are not as commonly used as mediums for drugs or vaccines when compared to other gel classes. This is due to the untested or pharmaceutically unacceptable solvents and gelators commonly used in organogel synthesis. Organogels that are used pharmaceutically include microemulsion-based gels and lecithin gels.

Some manufacturers decide to use organogels as a medium for drug delivery due to its potentially emollient effect. Some organogels contain bases composed of oleaginous substances. These bases can help retain skin moisture through the formation of an occlusive layer on the area of application. This occlusive layer traps moisture, allowing hydration of the skin and providing an emollient effect. This emollient effect is particularly helpful in formulation of topical gels for patients with dry and irritated skin.

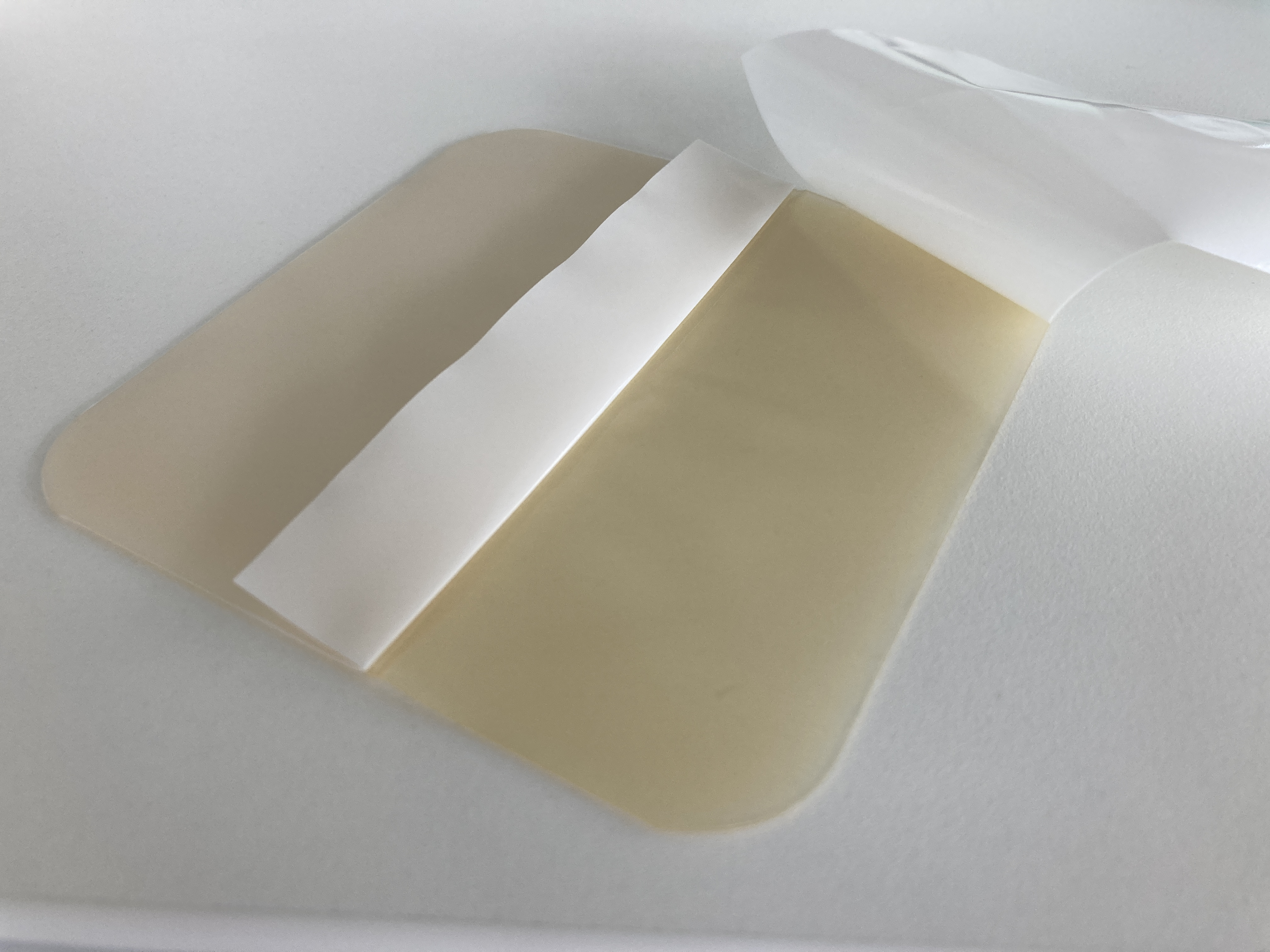
Hydrogel used for wound dressing

==== Hydrogels ====
Hydrogels have a high water content, with some hydrogels containing up to 90% water. Active drugs and other substances dispersed as colloids or dissolved in water can be easily taken up by hydrogels. Hydrogels are biocompatible. They also swell to a greater volume than organogels when in contact with water and other natural liquids.

Hydrogels can be used as drug delivery vehicles, for transdermal application, ophthalmic drug delivery, cancer treatment or for wound dressing.

As a type of water based formulation, hydrogels are generally less greasy and are easier to be removed than oil-based formulations like organogels. Examples of hydrogels include [[aluminium hydroxide|aluminum hydroxide]] gels and [[bentonite magma]].

== Method of Action ==
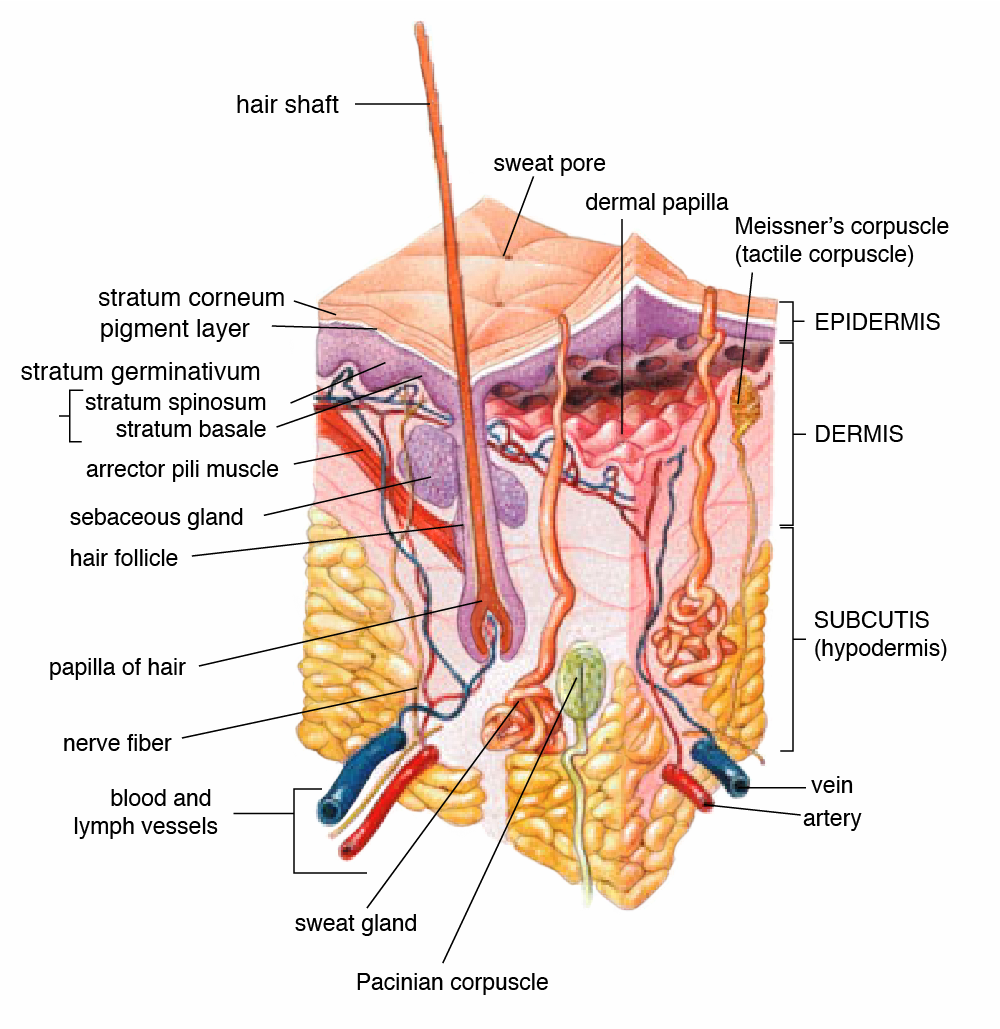
Layers of the skin

Drugs administered through topical application can act locally or systemically. However, the drug molecules must first be retained in and penetrate the surface layer of the skin.

Absorption of the drug through the skin surface is a passive process of diffusion. Skin penetration of the drug can take place by passive diffusion directly through the epidermis (via transcellular or intercellular routes), or absorption through shunt routes (diffusion through hair follicles and sweat glands). Initially, drug absorption may take place via the transfolliar route. After the drug reaches a steady state, transepidermal absorption may replace transfolliar absorption as the main pathway for absorption.

Drug absorption through the skin varies depending on the concentration gradient between the surface of the skin and the body, with a higher rate of absorption resulting from a greater concentration gradient. The rate of drug absorption can be maintained at a constant level by ensuring that the drug concentration at the surface of the skin remains consistently and substantially greater than that in the body.

The rate of penetration of the drug across the skin barrier depends on the physiological factors, physicochemical properties of the drug, and gel characteristics. Physiological factors include skin properties, size of application area, frequency and force of application. Physicochemical properties of the drug include drug solubility, affinity for the skin, and metabolism. Gel characteristics include stability, thermodynamic activity, and occlusive properties.

Following penetration through the skin barrier, the drug may permeate through deeper skin tissues and reach the blood capillaries in the dermis. It may then proceed to enter the systemic circulation for systemic effect.

== Gel Formulation Ingredients ==
Formulation of topical gels is determined by important factors such as appearance, odor, spreadability, extrudability, viscosity, pH, texture, microbial contamination potential and bioavailability. The components of the vehicle should serve to make the skin surface more penetrable to the drug.

Characteristics of the gel such as consistency and viscosity are affected by formulation design. Consistency and viscosity affect the adhesion and retention property of the gel, and are important in ensuring the gel is retained at the site of application and effective delivery of the drug.

The ingredients in topical gel formulation can be broadly categorized into four types: gelator, solvent, drug, and excipients.

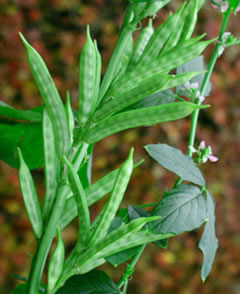
Guar gum is made from the seeds of cyamopsis tetragonolobus

=== Gelator ===
Gelators serve as stabilizers and thickeners, thickening the gel solution while simultaneously maintaining the gel's flexible nature. When dispersed through the solvent as a colloid, gelators offer a stable internal structure to the gel. Gelators are usually chosen based on their affinity for the solvent and the purpose of the gel. The nature of the gelators used determines the rigidity of the gel.

There are many types of gelators, of which carbomers are more frequently used due to their ability to thicken gels across a wide range of pH.

Gelators can be classified by polymer types, namely natural, semi-synthetic and synthetic polymers.

Natural gelators include tragacanth, gelatin, collagen, and guar gum; semi-synthetic gelators include methylcellulose and other cellulose derivatives; while synthetic gelators include carbomers, polyvinyl alcohol, polyethylene and its copolymers.

=== Solvent ===
Solvents are usually chosen based on the applications of the gel. They can be hydrophilic, lipophilic, or organic. Individual solvents can be used alone or as a mixture.

Some examples of solvents include purified water, glycerin, glycols, alcohols, sucrose, toluene, and mineral oils.

=== Drug ===
Topical delivery is often used for drugs that are easily degraded in the GI tract, or are highly susceptible to hepatic first pass effect. Even if the drug has to be administered for long periods of time or can induce adverse drug reactions in parts of the body other than the target location, it can still be formulated as a topical gel.

There are a number of physicochemical and biological properties that determine whether a drug is suitable for being delivered topically through a gel dosage form.

Physicochemical properties:

The drug must:

- Have a molecular weight smaller than 500 daltons.
- Be adequately lipophilic.
- Have a pH value greater than 5 and smaller than 9 when saturated in an aqueous solution.
- Not be highly acidic or highly alkaline.

Biological properties:

- The drug should be non-irritant and non-allergenic.
- Under a constant rate of delivery (zero order release profile), tolerance to the drug must not be developed.

=== Excipients ===
Excipients are materials inert to the drug, which are added into dosage forms to improve the overall quality of the dosage form. Some examples include antioxidants, sweetening agents, stabilizers, dispersing agents, penetration enhancers, buffers and preservatives.

Penetration enhancers are excipients that can increase skin permeability. Many classes of excipients can be used as penetration enhancers, such as glycerin, sulfoxides and related analogues, pyrrolidines, fatty acid and ethanol, surfactants etc.

Buffers can be added to control the pH of aqueous or hydroalcoholic based gels. Examples of buffers include phosphate and citrate.

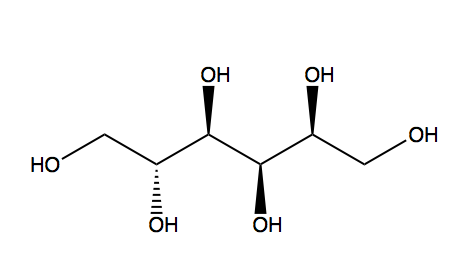
Sorbitol chemical structure

Preservatives are important for their antimicrobial action, and are especially important in formulation of hydrogels. Examples of preservatives include parabens and phenolics.

Antioxidants are used to prevent gel ingredients from being oxidised. When choosing the antioxidant to be used, it is important to consider the nature of the solvent. Since the solvent of most gels is aqueous in nature, water-soluble antioxidants are more commonly used. Some common examples include sodium metabisulphite and sodium formaldehyde sulfoxylate.

Sweetening agents are only used in gels that are designed to be used in the oral cavity, such as dental gels. Examples include sucrose, glycerol, sorbitol and liquid glucose.

== Gel Preparation Methods ==
The process of gel formation involves finding a balance between the concentrations of the gelator and the solvent. When adding a gelator to the solvent, the mixture remains in liquid state. As the concentration of the gelator increases to a certain critical concentration (gelling point), gelation occurs through swelling to form the semi-solid gel. Further increasing the concentration of the gelator beyond the gelling point will increase gel viscosity.

The exact gelling point varies depending on the properties of the gelator and the solvent, such as structure uniformity, molecular weight of the polymer, and flexibility of the polymer chain.

Generally, gels are prepared by firstly dissolving the soluble excipients in the solvent. The solution is then mixed using a mechanical stirrer. After that, the gelator is added slowly to the stirred mixture in order to avoid aggregation. Then, the mixture is continuously stirred until the polymer dissolves and a gel gradually forms. The gel is allowed to settle for one to two days before the final consistency of the gel can be reached.

The exact method of preparing gels depends on the properties of the formulation ingredients.

== Common uses of Gels ==
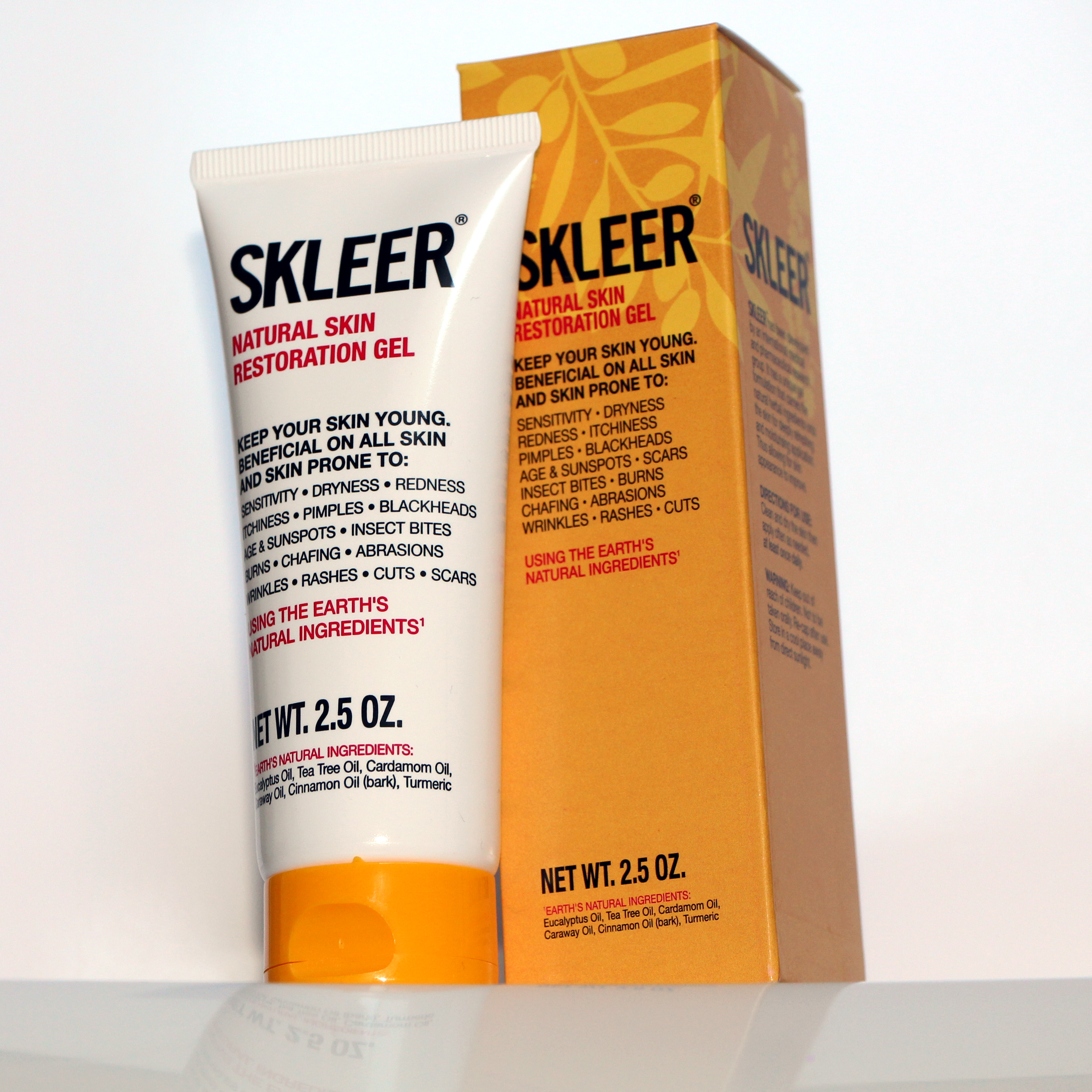
Example of cosmetic gels

Topical gels are commonly used as sustained release dosage forms. Usage of the sustained release dosage form reduces the administration of recurrent doses while maintaining serum dose levels within the therapeutic range (the range between the minimum effective dose and the minimum toxic dose), hence improving patient compliance.

Some topical gels are fast release gels, which are highly absorbent and can swell rapidly. These fast release gels can be used to treat acute disorders.

Topical gels are also used as lubricants, or carriers for pharmaceutical agents. They can be used as vehicles for different purposes, via different routes of administration, such as dental, dermatologicall, ophthalmic, intranasal, vaginal, rectal and others.

Topical gels are commonly used in cosmetics, which include shampoos, dentifrices, skin and hair care formulations and fragrance products, and can be used to treat scalp inflammation.

Topical gels can be used to deliver anti-inflammatory steroids to the scalp in treatment of scalp inflammations.

Product	Manufacturer	Drug	Gelator	Use	Route
REGRANEX gel	Johnson & Johnson	Becaplermin	Sodium CMC	Treatment of diabetic neuropathic ulcers	Transdermal
Topicort Gel	Taro	Desoximetasone	Carbomer 940	Antipruritic	Transdermal
Cleocin T Topical Gel	Pfizer	Clindamycin	Carbomer 934P	Treatment of acne vulgaris	Transdermal
MetroGel Vaginal	Galderma	Metronidazole	Carbomer 934P	Treatment of bacterial vaginosis	Vaginal
Condylox Gel	Watson	Podofilox	Hydroxypropyl cellulose	Treatment of anogenital warts	Rectal

Examples of Commercially available topical gels.

== Advantages of topical gels ==
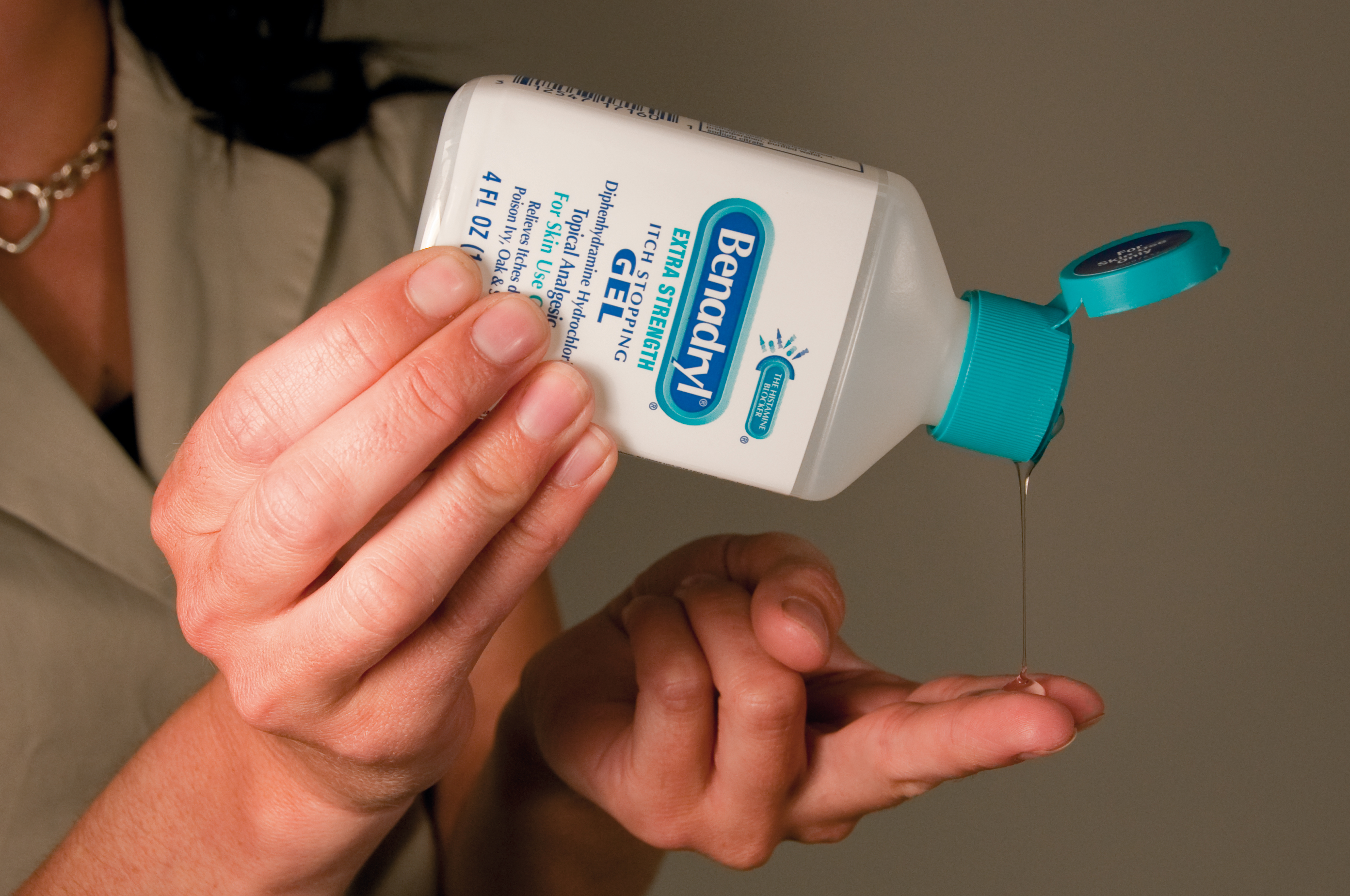
Topical gel

The texture of topical gels is less greasy as it contains a higher proportion of water compared with cream and ointment. These gels have an excellent spreading property and cooling effect due to solvent evaporation, and also has a higher retention time on the skin. Topical gels are more stable than creams and ointments, and can adhere well to the site of application. They form an occlusive layer on the application site that can act as a form of protection. They can be washed off easily and are nontoxic due to their unique composition and structure. They have minimal side effects due to their localized effect. Topical gels are convenient and easy to apply. The topical mode of action of topical gels is also non-invasive. These favorable factors of topical gels improve patient compliance and tolerability.

The formulation and manufacturing processes of topical gels are relatively simpler and more cost effective than other semisolid dosage forms. The release profile of the gel can be modified by altering the properties of the gelator, allowing for continuous drug delivery. Topical gels are also eco-friendly, biocompatible and biodegradable.

The drug can penetrate deeply into the skin and be directly delivered to the target site, as the topical application allows it to avoid hepatic first pass metabolism. Difficulties in gastrointestinal absorption caused by pH, enzymatic activity and drug-food interactions can be minimized, while at the same time avoiding GI irritation. The topical dosage form allows stable and continuous drug delivery to the site of application, while having a faster drug release than ointments and creams. All these can increase the drug's bioavailability in the body.

== Limitations of topical gels ==
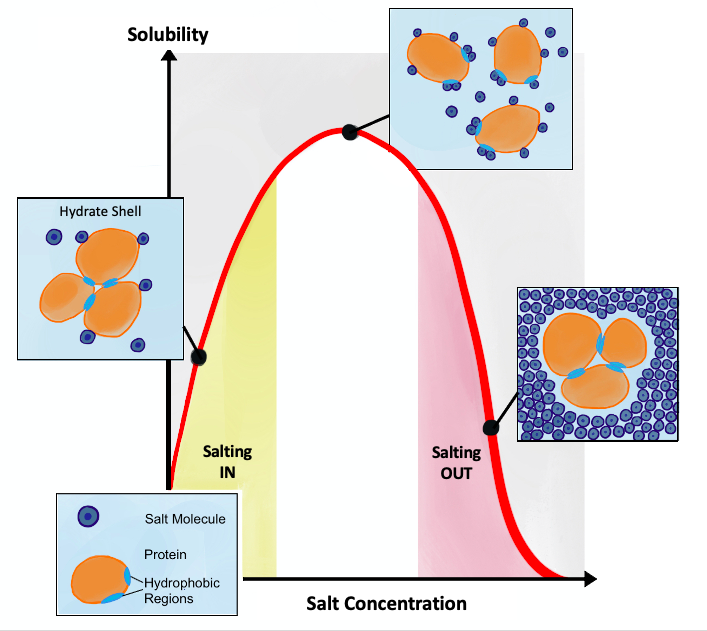
Illustration of salting out process

There may be flocculation in some gels, which may produce an unstable gel. The rheology of some gels are easily altered by environmental factors such as temperature and humidity, resulting in stricter storage requirements. Syneresis of the gel may occur during storage, causing the gel to shrink unpredictably or even dry out. The gelators may precipitate and salt out, and some drugs may degrade in gel formulation due to the other ingredients present in the formulation.

Some additives and gelators added into the formulation may cause irritation problems, such as skin irritation, dermatitis or allergic conditions. The increased water content in gels increases the chances of bacterial or fungal attack, which may contaminate the gel, making it unsuitable for use. Considering the direct route of administration, drugs must be very small in size to have an effective plasma concentration for action. The particle size and other properties of the drug may also affect its absorption through the skin barrier, resulting in an unreliable effect.
