= Flory–Stockmayer theory =

Theory of gel formation

Flory–Stockmayer theory is a theory governing the cross-linking and gelation of step-growth polymers. The Flory–Stockmayer theory represents an advancement from the Carothers equation, allowing for the identification of the gel point for polymer synthesis not at stoichiometric balance. The theory was initially conceptualized by Paul Flory in 1941 and then was further developed by Walter Stockmayer in 1944 to include cross-linking with an arbitrary initial size distribution. The Flory–Stockmayer theory was the first theory investigating percolation processes. Flory–Stockmayer theory is a special case of random graph theory of gelation.

== History ==
Gelation occurs when a polymer forms large interconnected polymer molecules through cross-linking. In other words, polymer chains are cross-linked with other polymer chains to form an infinitely large molecule, interspersed with smaller complex molecules, shifting the polymer from a liquid to a network solid or gel phase. The Carothers equation is an effective method for calculating the degree of polymerization for stoichiometrically balanced reactions. However, the Carothers equation is limited to branched systems, describing the degree of polymerization only at the onset of cross-linking. The Flory–Stockmayer Theory allows for the prediction of when gelation occurs using percent conversion of initial monomer and is not confined to cases of stoichiometric balance. Additionally, the Flory–Stockmayer Theory can be used to predict whether gelation is possible through analyzing the limiting reagent of the step-growth polymerization.

== Flory's assumptions ==
In creating the Flory–Stockmayer Theory, Flory made three assumptions that affect the accuracy of this model. These assumptions were:

1. All functional groups on a branch unit are equally reactive
2. All reactions occur between A and B
3. There are no intramolecular reactions

As a result of these assumptions, a conversion slightly higher than that predicted by the Flory–Stockmayer Theory is commonly needed to actually create a polymer gel. Since steric hindrance effects prevent each functional group from being equally reactive and intramolecular reactions do occur, the gel forms at slightly higher conversion.

Flory postulated that his treatment can also be applied to chain-growth polymerization mechanisms, as the three criteria stated above are satisfied under the assumptions that (1) the probability of chain termination is independent of chain length, and (2) multifunctional co-monomers react randomly with growing polymer chains.

== General case ==
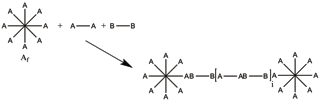
A general image of a multifunctional branch unit, $A_f$, reacting with bifunctional monomers with A and B functional groups to form a step-growth polymer.

The Flory–Stockmayer Theory predicts the gel point for the system consisting of three types of monomer units

linear units with two A-groups (concentration $c_1$),
linear units with two B groups (concentration $c_2$),
branched A units (concentration $c_3$).

The following definitions are used to formally define the system

$f$ is the number of reactive functional groups on the branch unit (i.e. the functionality of that branch unit)
$p_A$ is the probability that A has reacted (conversion of A groups)
$p_B$ is the probability that B has reacted (conversion of B groups)
$\rho = \frac{ f c_3 }{2 c_1+f c_3}$ is the ratio of number of A groups in the branch unit to the total number of A groups
$r=\frac{2 c_1+f c_3}{2 c_2}=\frac{p_B}{p_A}$ is the ratio between total number of A and B groups. So that $p_B=r p_A.$

The theory states that the gelation occurs only if $\alpha > \alpha_c$, where

$$\alpha_c = \frac{1}{f-1}$$

is the critical value for cross-linking and $\alpha$ is presented as a function of $p_A$,

$$\alpha(p_A) = \frac{ r p_A^2  \rho } { 1 - r p_A^2  ( 1 - \rho ) }$$

or, alternatively, as a function of $p_B$,

$$\alpha(p_B) = \frac{ p_B^2  \rho } { r - p_B^2  ( 1 - \rho ) }$$.

One may now substitute expressions for $r, \rho$ into definition of $\alpha$ and obtain the critical values of $p_A, (p_B)$ that admit gelation. Thus gelation occurs if

$$p_A>\sqrt{\frac{ \alpha_c   } { r(\alpha_c + \rho - \alpha_c  \rho )}}.$$

alternatively, the same condition for $p_B$ reads,

$$p_B> \sqrt{\frac{ r \alpha_c   } { \alpha_c + \rho - \alpha_c  \rho }}$$

The both inequalities are equivalent and one may use the one that is more convenient. For instance, depending on which conversion $p_A$ or $p_B$ is resolved analytically.

=== Trifunctional A monomer with difunctional B monomer ===
A trifunctional branch unit with A functional group reacting with a bifunctional branch unit with a B functional group, forming a continuous step-growth polymer molecule.

$$\alpha_c=\frac{1}{f-1}=\frac{1}{3-1}=\frac{1}{2}$$

Since all the A functional groups are from the trifunctional monomer, ρ = 1 and

$$\alpha=\frac{\frac{p_B^2\rho}{r}}{1-\frac{p_B^2 (1-\rho)}{r}}=\frac{p_B^2}{r}$$

Therefore, gelation occurs when

$$\frac{p_B^2}{r}> \alpha_c$$

or when,

$$p_B>\sqrt{\frac{r}{2}}$$

Similarly, gelation occurs when

$$p_A> \sqrt{\frac{1}{2r}}$$
