= Heparin mimicking polymers =

Synthetic compound and anticoagulant

Heparin mimicking polymers are synthetic compounds that possess similar characteristics to heparin, that is it can be used clinically as an anticoagulant. These compounds like heparin possess a negative charge density that allows it to interact and inhibit the coagulation process. Glucose or mannose-contain n-alkyl urea peptoid oligomer, glucose modified diamine with pedant monosaccharides are examples of heparin mimicking polymers. Heparin mimicking polymers can also be used to create biomaterials for surgical application such as pacemakers, stents, etc.

Heparin is widely used as a clinical anticoagulant however, it possesses drawbacks creating a need for synthetic heparin mimicking polymers. Events such as the 2008 heparin contamination event, and mad cow disease further enhance the new demand for more robust anticoagulants. Additionally prolonged use of heparin results in heparin induced thrombocytopenia.

Three aspects of synthetic mimicking polymers are currently focused on: mimicking anionic sulfate domains of heparin, polymerization of sulfated saccharides and sulfation of natural occurring GAGs.

== Synthesis ==
Heparin mimicking polymers can be synthesized through a variety of mechanisms. To begin, monomers can be either synthesized or purchased from avenues such as Sigma Aldrich. The monomers are the basic subunits of the polymer and can be designed to incorporate specific functional groups, e.g. sugars, urea, which can enhance the biocompatibility of the heparin-mimicking polymer. The monomers can then be linked together through a processed call polymerization. This processed specifically can be achieved via various mechanisms such as step growth polymerization, RAFT, etc. Through the process of polymerization, monomers of the heparin mimicking polymers are covalently linked together to increase the molecular weight. Post polymerization, the polymer chains can be cross-linked to one another thus forming a larger polymer network.

The chain length, intermolecular forces and reactive sites influence the specific function of the heparin-mimicking polymer. By altering the chemical structure of the polymer, certain properties can be exhibited. For example, studies have shown that by altering the thermal transition of the polymer, shape memory behavior can be exhibited. This is where the polymer conforms to deformed shape and then returns to its original configuration due to certain stimulus. Heparin-mimicking polymers can be designed to exhibit shape memory behavior.

== Characterization ==
Heparin mimicking polymers can be characterized by various techniques. For example, both proton nuclear magnetic resonance (H1NMR) and FTIR spectroscopy can aid in the identification of functional groups. However H1NMR depicts a better image of the chemical structure of the monomer. Contact angle measurements can help determine the hydrophobicity or hydrophilicity of the polymer, this extremely useful for creating water-soluble biomaterials.

== Applications ==
Heparin-mimicking polymers can be used for a variety of applications in the body. These include, the coating for pacemakers, surgical catheter and stents.

=== Clinical use ===
Shape memory heparin mimicking polymers can be used to create devices that extract hemorrhaging tissue. Microactuator (right) is a prototype endovascular electromechanical clot-extraction device. This device consists of electromechanical microactuator mounted on the distal tip of either a Prowler-14 microcatheter The microactuator is fabricated using a shape memory polymer (SMP) shell over a shape memory nickel-titanium alloy (nitinol) wire backbone with attached copper leads to deliver a current. The microactuator maintains a straight rod shape until the applied current, provided by a DC power supply, heating the nitinol wire, causing the microactuator to transform into a corkscrew shape capable of retrieving a blood clot. At body temperature, the overlying SMP is in a glassy state and maintains the nitinol tightly coiled configuration in a straight form for endovascular delivery. Once the microactuator is positioned beyond the clot, joule heating is initiated. As the surrounding SMP is heated by conduction to its characteristic glass-transition temperature (Tg ≈ 80 °C), it transitions to its rubbery state, allowing the nitinol to resume its corkscrew shape. Retrieval of the blood clot occurs through a pull back motion. The nitinol is engulfed in a tight space even though it is expanding and as a result retreats thus extracting the tissue.
