= Gelation =

Formation of a gel from a mass of polymers

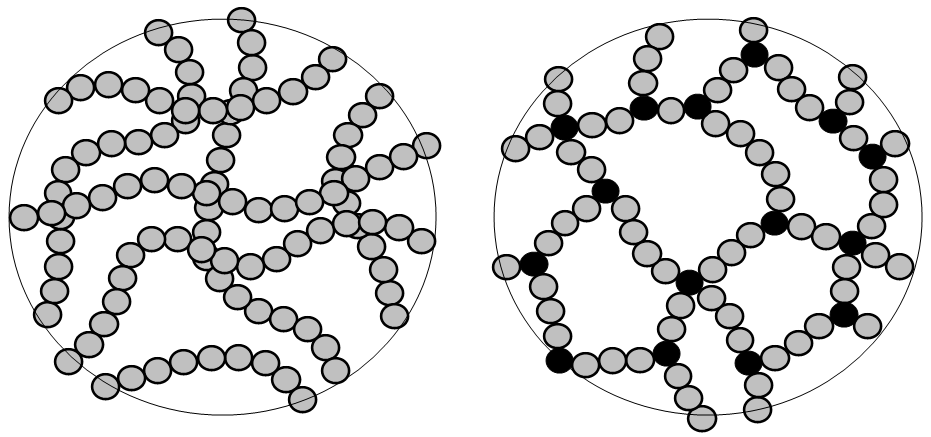
Polymers prior (no gel) and after crosslinking (gel)

In polymer chemistry, gelation (gel transition) is the formation of a gel from a system with polymers. Branched polymers can form links between the chains, which lead to progressively larger polymers. As the linking continues, larger branched polymers are obtained and at a certain extent of the reaction, links between the polymer result in the formation of a single macroscopic molecule. At that point in the reaction, which is defined as gel point, the system loses fluidity and viscosity becomes very large. The onset of gelation, or gel point, is accompanied by a sudden increase in viscosity. This "infinite" sized polymer is called the gel or network, which does not dissolve in the solvent, but can swell in it.

== Background ==
Gelation is promoted by gelling agents. Gelation can occur either by physical linking or by chemical crosslinking. While the physical gels involve physical bonds, chemical gelation involves covalent bonds. The first quantitative theories of chemical gelation were formulated in the 1940s by Flory and Stockmayer. Critical percolation theory was successfully applied to gelation in 1970s. A number of growth models (diffusion limited aggregation, cluster-cluster aggregation, kinetic gelation) were developed in the 1980s to describe the kinetic aspects of aggregation and gelation.

== Quantitative approaches to determine gelation ==
It is important to be able to predict the onset of gelation, since it is an irreversible process that dramatically changes the properties of the system.

=== Average functionality approach ===
According to the Carothers equation number-average degree of polymerization $DP_n$ is given by

$DP_n= \frac{2}{2-p.f_{av}}$

where $p$ is the extent of the reaction and $f_{av}$ is the average functionality of reaction mixture. For the gel $DP_n$ can be considered to be infinite, thus the critical extent of the reaction at the gel point is found as

$p_c=\frac {2}{f_{av}}$

If $p$ is greater or equal to $p_c$, gelation occurs.

=== Flory Stockmayer approach ===
Flory and Stockmayer used a statistical approach to derive an expression to predict the gel point by calculating when $DP_n$ approaches infinite size. The statistical approach assumes that (1) the reactivity of the functional groups of the same type is the same and independent of the molecular size and (2) there are no intramolecular reactions between the functional groups on the same molecule.

Consider the polymerization of bifunctional molecules $A-A$, $B-B$ and multifunctional $A_f$, where $f$ is the functionality. The extends of the functional groups are $p_A$and $p_B$, respectively. The ratio of all A groups, both reacted and unreacted, that are part of branched units, to the total number of A groups in the mixture is defined as $\rho$. This will lead to the following reaction

$A-A + B-B + A_f \rightarrow A_{f-1}-(B-BA-A)_nB-BA-A_{f-1}$

The probability of obtaining the product of the reaction above is given by $p_A[p_B(1-\rho)p_A]^np_B\rho$, since the probability that a B group reach with a branched unit is $p_B\rho$ and the probability that a B group react with non-branched A is $p_B(1-\rho)$.

This relation yields to an expression for the extent of reaction of A functional groups at the gel point

$p_c= \frac {1}{\{r[1+\rho(f-2)]\}^{1/2}}$

where r is the ratio of all A groups to all B groups. If more than one type of multifunctional branch unit is present and average $f$ value is used for all monomer molecules with functionality greater than 2.

Note that the relation does not apply for reaction systems containing monofunctional reactants and/or both A and B type of branch units.

=== Erdős–Rényi model ===
Gelation of polymers can be described in the framework of the Erdős–Rényi model or the Lushnikov model, which answers the question when a giant component arises.

=== Random graph ===
The structure of a gel network can be conceptualised as a random graph. This analogy is exploited to calculate the gel point and gel fraction for monomer precursors with arbitrary types of functional groups. Random graphs can be used to derive analytical expressions for simple polymerisation mechanisms, such as step-growth polymerisation, or alternatively, they can be combined with a system of rate equations that are integrated numerically.

== See also ==
- Mechanics of gelation
