= Mechanics of gelation =

Processes relevant to the sol-gel process

Mechanics of gelation describes processes relevant to sol-gel process.

In a static sense, the fundamental difference between a liquid and a solid is that the solid has elastic resistance against a shearing stress while a liquid does not. Thus, a simple liquid will not typically support a transverse acoustic phonon, or shear wave. Gels have been described by Born as liquids in which an elastic resistance against shearing survives, yielding both viscous and elastic properties. It has been shown theoretically that in a certain low-frequency range, polymeric gels should propagate shear waves with relatively low damping. The distinction between a sol (solution) and a gel therefore appears to be understood in a manner analogous to the practical distinction between the elastic and plastic deformation ranges of a metal. The distinction lies in the ability to respond to an applied shear force via macroscopic viscous flow.

In a dynamic sense, the response of a gel to an alternating force (oscillation or vibration) will depend upon the period or frequency of vibration. As indicated here, even most simple liquids will exhibit some elastic response at shear rates or frequencies exceeding 5 million cycles per second. Experiments on such short time scales probe the fundamental motions of the primary particles (or particle clusters) which constitute the lattice structure or aggregate. The increasing resistance of certain liquids to flow at high stirring speeds is one manifestation of this phenomenon. The ability of a condensed body to respond to a mechanical force by viscous flow is thus strongly dependent on the time scale over which the load is applied, and thus the frequency and amplitude of the stress wave in oscillatory experiments.

== Structural relaxation ==
The structural relaxation of a viscoelastic gel has been identified as primary mechanism responsible for densification and associated pore evolution in both colloidal and polymeric silica gels. Experiments in the viscoelastic properties of such skeletal networks on various time scales require a force varying with a period (or frequency) appropriate to the relaxation time of the phenomenon investigated, and inversely proportional to the distance over which such relaxation occurs. High frequencies associated with ultrasonic waves have been used extensively in the handling of polymer solutions, liquids and gels and the determination of their viscoelastic properties. Static measurements of the shear modulus have been made, as well as dynamic measurements of the speed of propagation of shear waves, which yields the dynamic modulus of rigidity. Dynamic light scattering (DLS) techniques have been utilized in order to monitor the dynamics of density fluctuations through the behavior of the autocorrelation function near the point of gelation.

== Phase transition ==
Tanaka et al., emphasize that the discrete and reversible volume transitions which occur in partially hydrolyzed acrylamide gels can be interpreted in terms of a phase transition of the system consisting of the charged polymer network, hydrogen (counter)ions and liquid matrix. The phase transition is a manifestation of competition among the three forces which contribute to the osmotic pressure in the gel:

1. The positive osmotic pressure of (+) hydrogen ions
2. The negative pressure due to polymer-polymer affinity
3. The rubber-like elasticity of the polymer network

The balance of these forces varies with change in temperature or solvent properties. The total osmotic pressure acting on the system is the sum osmotic pressure of the gel. It is further shown that the phase transition can be induced by the application of an electric field across the gel. The volume change at the transition point is either discrete (as in a first-order Ehrenfest transition) or continuous (second order Ehrenfest analogy), depending on the degree of ionization of the gel and on the solvent composition.

== Elastic continuum ==
The gel is thus interpreted as an elastic continuum, which deforms when subjected to externally applied shear forces, but is incompressible upon application of hydrostatic pressure. This combination of fluidity and rigidity is explained in terms of the gel structure: that of a liquid contained within a fibrous polymer network or matrix by the extremely large friction between the liquid and the fiber or polymer network. Thermal fluctuations may produce infinitesimal expansion or contraction within the network, and the evolution of such fluctuations will ultimately determine the molecular morphology and the degree of hydration of the body.

Quasi-elastic light scattering offers direct experimental access to measurement of the wavelength and lifetimes of critical fluctuations, which are governed by the viscoelastic properties of the gel. It is reasonable to expect a relationship between the amplitude of such fluctuations and the elasticity of the network. Since the elasticity measures the resistance of the network to either elastic (reversible) or plastic (irreversible) deformation, the fluctuations should grow larger as the elasticity declines. The divergence of the scattered light intensity at a finite critical temperature implies that the elasticity approaches zero, or the compressibility becomes infinite, which is the typically observed behavior of a system at the point of instability. Thus, at the critical point, the polymer network offers no resistance at all to any form of deformation.

== Ultimate microstructure ==
The rate of relaxation of density fluctuations will be rapid if the restoring force, which depends upon the network elasticity, is large—and if the friction between the network and the interstitial fluid is small. The theory suggests that the rate is directly proportional to the elasticity and inversely proportional to the frictional force. The friction in turn depends upon both the viscosity of the fluid and the average size of the pores contained within the polymer network.

Thus, if the elasticity is inferred from the measurements of the scattering intensity, and the viscosity is determined independently (via mechanical methods such as ultrasonic attenuation) measurement of the relaxation rate yields information on the pore size distribution contained within the polymer network, e.g. large fluctuations in polymer density near the critical point yield large density differentials with a corresponding bimodal distribution of porosity. The difference in average size between the smaller pores (in the highly dense regions) and the larger pores (in regions of lower average density) will therefore depend upon the degree of phase separation which is allowed to occur before such fluctuations become thermally arrested or "frozen in" at or near the critical point of the transition.

== See also ==
- Freeze-casting
- Freeze gelation
- Random graph theory of gelation
