= Herrick L. Johnston =

American businessman

- Born: March 29, 1898; Jacksonville, Ohio
- Died: October 6, 1965 (aged 67)
- Scientific career
- Notable students: Paul Flory

Herrick Lee Johnston (29 March 1898 – 6 October 1965) was an American scientist specializing in cryogenics, born in Jacksonville, Ohio.

== University of California ==
Johnston was a researcher at the University of California at Berkeley 1925-28 and an associate of cryogenics pioneer William Giauque when his experiments proved the existence of oxygen isotopes with atomic masses 17 and 18. Previously it had been believed that oxygen only existed as ^{16}O; as atomic masses of other elements were calculated on the basis of 16.0 not 16.0035, this was a significant discovery. The work, published in 1929, also led to the discovery in 1932 of heavy hydrogen (deuterium) by Harold C Urey. Giauque was awarded the 1949 Nobel Prize in Chemistry for this work, and did not forget to recognize Johnston's contribution.

== Ohio State University ==
Johnston was appointed assistant professor at Ohio State University in 1929 with plans to create a cryogenics laboratory to rival that at Berkeley, but sufficient funds were not available until 1939, boosted by federal money earmarked for war-related research, notably the Manhattan Project, for which he was a director from 1942 to 1946. A new building (titled War Research Building) was completed around the end of 1942 and the first liquid hydrogen was produced in February 1943. Johnston had a reputation for working himself and his staff hard, especially under tight deadlines. He was impatient with bureaucracy, and frequently ran into trouble with his propensity to cut corners. Despite, or perhaps because of these characteristics, he was admired by students and inspired great loyalty. One of his researchers, engineer Gwynne A Wright, remained with him for 16 years. One of his PhD students, Paul J Flory, who won the Nobel Prize for chemistry in 1974, cited Johnston's 'boundless zeal' as an inspiration.

He was appointed associate professor 1933–38, then professor 1938–54. During this time he also saw work at the University of Göttingen, Germany (1933) and General Electric laboratories at Schenectady, NY (1937).

== Business ==
Johnston saw the US Government's decision to pursue research on a fission weapon (hydrogen bomb) as an opportunity to utilise his expertise in volume production, storage and transportation of liquid hydrogen (and deuterium). In 1952 he founded his own company H L Johnston Company Inc. to produce deuterium for the first 'thermonuclear device' which was successfully tested at Eniwetok Atoll on 1 November 1952. His company developed huge mobile refrigerated dewars for transporting bulk liquid hydrogen and even larger mobile plants for generating liquid hydrogen, for the US Air Force. He remained on the staff at Ohio State University all this time, but with a greatly reduced presence.

== Personal life ==
Johnston married Margaret Vanderbilt (1901-1996) on 14 June 1923. They had two sons, William Vanderbilt and Robert Edgar, and a daughter, Margaret Louise.

== Recognition ==
In 1970 the War Research Building at Ohio State University was renamed Johnston Laboratory in his honour.

== Sources ==
- Who's Who in Science (Marquis Who's Who Inc, Chicago Ill. 1968) ISBN 0-8379-1001-3
