= Flory convention =

In polymer science, the Flory convention is a convention for labelling rotational isomers of polymers. It is named after Nobel Prize-winning Paul Flory.

The convention states that for a given bond, when the dihedral angle formed between the previous and subsequent bonds projected on the plane normal to the bond is 0 degrees, the state is labelled as "trans", and when the angle is 180 degrees, the angle is labelled as "cis".
