= Low molecular-mass organic gelators =

Low molecular-mass organic gelators (LMOGs) are the monomeric sub-unit which form self-assembled fibrillar networks (SAFINs) that entrap solvent between the strands. SAFINs arise from the formation of strong non-covalent interactions between LMOG monomeric sub-units. As SAFINs are forming, the long fibers become intertwined and trap solvent molecules. Once solvent molecules are entrapped within the network, they are immobilized by surface tension effects. The stability of a gel is dependent on the equilibrium between the assembled network and the dissolved gelators. One characteristic of an LMOG, that demonstrates its stability, is its ability to contain an organic solvent at the boiling point of that solvent due to extensive solvent-fibrillar interactions. Gels self-assemble through non-covalent interactions such as π-stacking, hydrogen-bonding, or Van der Waals interactions to form volume-filling 3D networks. Self-assembly is key to gel formation and dependent upon reversible bond formation. The propensity of a low molecular weight molecule to form LMOGs is classified by its Minimum Gelation Concentration (MGC). The MGC is the lowest possible gelator concentration needed to form a stable gel. A lower MGC is desired to minimize the amount of gelator material needed to form gels. Super gelators have a MGC of less than 1 wt%.

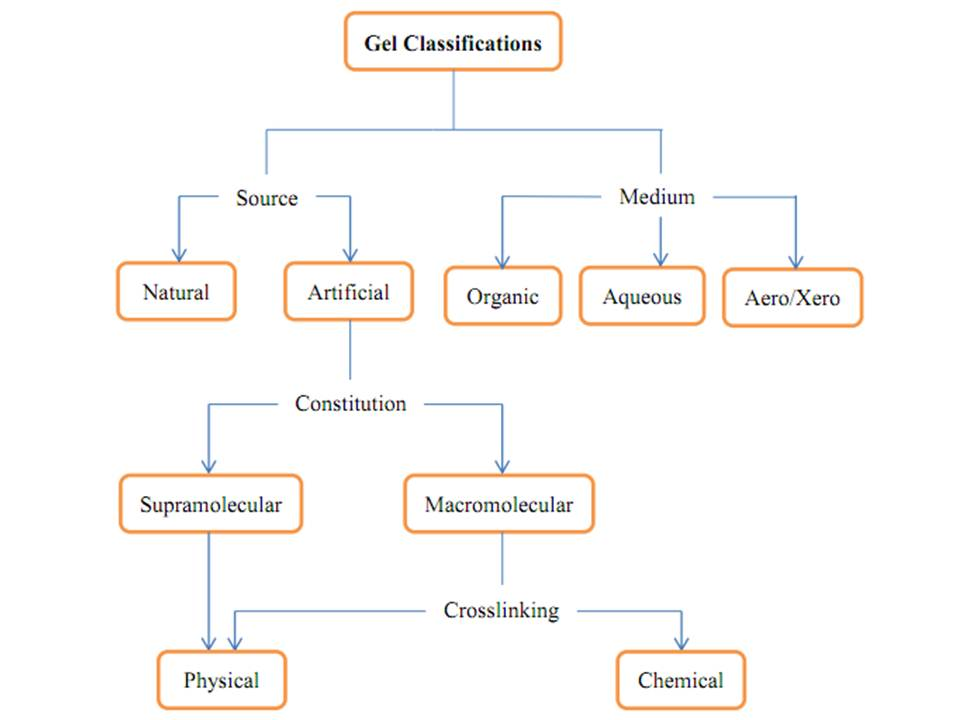
Gels can be organized according to multiple characteristics. The source of the gel (natural/artificial), the gel's medium (organic/aqueous/areo/xero), the constitution of the gel (macromolecular/supramolecular), and the type of crosslinking the gel forms (physical/chemical).

== Background and significance ==
LMOGs were first reported in the 1930s, but advances in the field were more often than not discoveries of chance; as there existed little theoretical understanding of gel formation. During this time LMOGs found applications in thickening lubricants, printing inks, and napalm. Interest in the field dwindled for several decades until the mid-1990s when Hanabusa, Shinkai, and Hamilton designed numerous LMOGs which form thermoreversible intermolecular amide-carbonyl hydrogen bonds. The LMOGs developed by Hanabusa et al. were suitable for forming hard gels, including gels with chloroform, which had been resistant to gelation prior to their discovery. These new LMOGs were rationally designed and represented the first time that scientists had been able to discover new LMOGs based on supramolecular principles. From these earliest studies and screening numerous compounds, it was determined that for thermoreversible gels based on the amide-carbonyl hydrogen bond, amino acid structure, enantiopurity, hydrophilic-lypophilic ratio, and increasing peptide substitution greatly affected the gelling ability of various new compounds.

The aforementioned principles that developed in this field's infancy have proved successful in allowing researchers to tune LMOGs for different functions. Today, LMOGs have been extensively studied for their unique properties. This newfound functional diversity has led to a wide range of possible applications for LMOGs in agriculture, drug delivery, pollutant/heavy metal remediation, luminescent devices, and chemical sensing.

== Gel formation and morphology ==
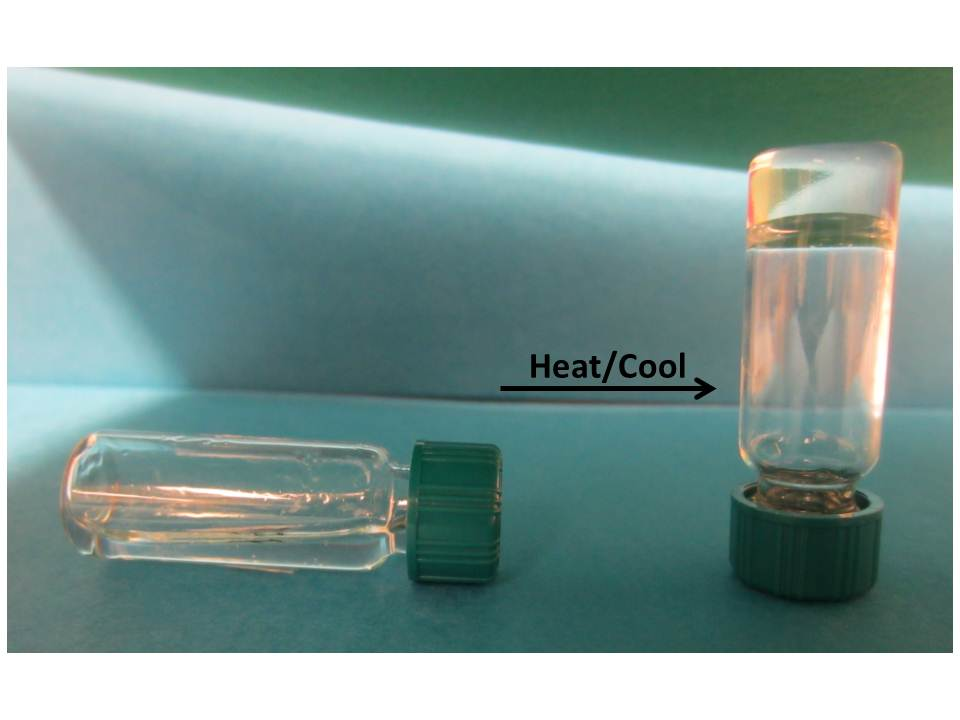
A LMOG liquid mixture forming a gel upon heating and cooling.

Making a gel

The majority of LMOGs can be triggered to form by manipulating the systems' properties, such as the pH, solvent, exposure to light, or by introducing oxidizing or reducing reagents. Researchers have proposed a set of guidelines for successful gel formation

1. It is necessary to have the presence of strong self-complementary and unidirectional inter-molecular interactions that can enforce 1D self-assembly.

2. The solvent-fiber interfacial energy should be manipulated to control solubility and prevent crystallization of the LMOG.

3. Some other factor must be present that can induce the fiber cross-linking network formation.

Traditionally, gel phase transitions are strictly temperature dependent. However, it has recently been shown that non-liquid crystalline gelators, composed of (R)-18-(n-alkylamino)octadecan-7-ols (HSN-n), undergo first order gel-to-gel phase transitions; leading to different morphologies of the gel in carbon tetrachloride (CCl_{4}). The uniqueness of this discovery stems from the idea that it is the solvent molecules entering and exiting the structure which leads to the different structural morphologies. All other previously known gel phase transitions have occurred as the result of temperature changes and only one previous case documents this type of solvent dependent morphological change. However, even in the case of N-isopropylacrylamide hydrogels that underwent conformational changes (folding and unfolding of their polymer chains); it occurred only via a temperature dependent process which resulted in water molecules, near the structure, entering or exiting the structure. The stability of a formed gelation matrix is dependent on the equilibrium between the assembled network and the dissolved gelator assemblies. LMOGs are functionally diverse and can be composed of both polar and non-polar regions (amphiphiles).

=== Scanning electron microscopy ===
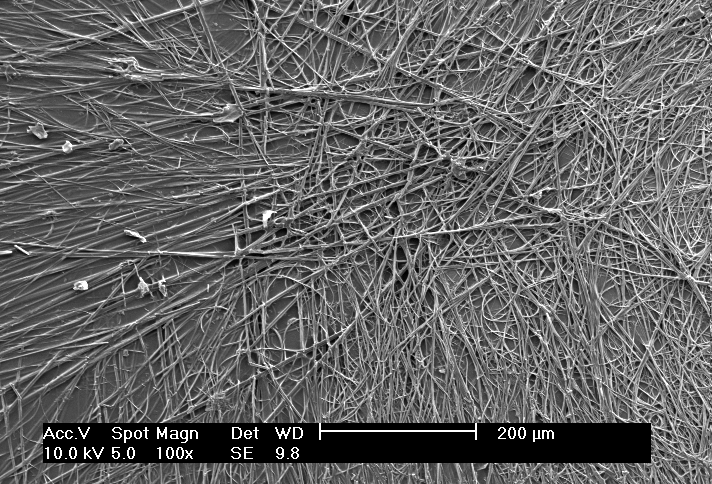
SEM of a Low Molecular Weight Gelator

Scanning Electron Microscopy is a useful means for researchers to determine the structural properties of a low molecular-mass weight gel. These gels exhibit a wide range of structures; from fibrous strands (of various lengths) to ribbons and tubes. The structure of these gels is a key factor in their ability to gel solvents or water. Their tertiary structure determines the critical gelation concentration of the gel.

== Rheological measurements ==
Generally, rheology is used to study the flow of matter within a substance. In order for a substance to be considered a gel it must possess solid-like traits when characterized by rheological measurements. Rheological characterization, tests materials by applying stress to measure the material's resistance to deformation. From rheological measurements, a gel can be classified as either a "strong" or "weak" gel. This classification emphasizes the strength of the interactions between gelator molecules in a particular gel. A "weak" gel is often not considered a true gel because it does not conform to a purely solid-like material's rheological traits. Instead, "weak" gels are generally better classified as viscoelastic liquids.

As a result of this distinction, these classes of gels demonstrate different elasticity as calculated by the elastic modulus, a mathematical model for predicting the elasticity of different materials under different stressors. The shear modulus (G) of a "strong" gel exhibits a smaller dissipation of energy than "weak" gels, and the "strong" gel's G-values plateau for longer periods of time. Furthermore, rheological properties of different gels can occasionally be used to compare naturally occurring biopolymer gels with synthetic LMOGs.

== Interactions of gel and solvent ==
Researchers have not been able to reliably predict novel LMOGs. A key aspect in predicting new gelator materials is understanding the interaction between the gel molecules and the solvent. The most common solvents for LMOGs are organic in nature and result in organogels. Much rarer are hydrogels, or gels that form with water as the solvent. Several attempts have been made to quantify the gel and solvent interaction using a variety of parameters:

The single or multi-component solubility parameter (δ) of a solvent can give insight on how well-suited the solvent will be for gelation. Depending on the gelator/solvent system, a high solubility parameter can indicate high or low thermal stability of the gel.
The dielectric constant (ε) reflects the bulk polarity of the solvent.
The Dimroth-Reichardt parameter (E_{T}(30)) is a measure of ionizing power of a solvent.
The Kamlet-Taft solvent parameters establish solvatochromic relationships which measure separately the hydrogen bond donor (α), hydrogen bond acceptor (β), and polarizability (π^{*}) of solvents.
The Hildebrand parameter measures the energy it takes to create a cavity within a solvent.

== Applications ==
=== Agricultural industry ===
Pheromone release devices Multiple reservoir-type controlled release devices (CRDs) have been developed to achieve the controlled release of highly volatile pheromones into an agricultural setting; whereby they could act as pesticides throughout the growing season. There are several draw-backs associated with current CRDs because they involve multi-step preparation protocols, exhibit low pheromone-holding capacities, are not biodegradable, and exhibit leaking of the pheromones when compressed or broken. To address these functional issues a sugar alcohol-based amphiphilic super-gelator, mannitol dioctanoate (M8), has been developed that efficiently gelled the pheromones, 2-heptanone and lauryl acetate. The miticide, 2-heptanone controls the parasitic mite, varroa (Varroa destructor), that are responsible for honey bee (Apis mellifera L) colony destruction. The researchers further developed the application of this supergelator by developing a reservoir-type CRD that consisted of the 2-heptanone gel in a vapor-barrier-film sealed pouch which was then activated by boring a small hole through the vapor barrier. The CRD had a high loading capacity of 92% wt/wt allowing for the construction of small devices with a high biocompatibility and because, M8 is composed of mannitol and fatty acids it is also biodegradable. Some amino acid methyl esters, namely valine-, leucine-, and isoleucine-methyl esters, are the sex pheromones of Phyllophaga pests. By crystal engineering approach, these pheromones were reacted with cinnamic acid analogs. The prepared organic salts produced gel in many non-protic solvents and can release sex pheromone slowly. The pests could be trapped physically by keeping these gelator salts inside a trap.

=== Drug delivery ===
Researchers have been exploring LMOGs belonging to a class of molecules called cyclohexane trisamides due to their ability to form hydrogels. By attaching functional groups to the gelator molecule, the researchers can adjust the gelation properties. The gels transition to the liquid state upon changes in temperature or pH Taking it one step further, the researchers attached an amino acid and a model drug to the gel molecule and added an enzyme to the gel matrix. When the temperature or pH was changed, the gel molecules entered the liquid phase where the amino acid and drug molecule could be cleaved from the gel molecule by the enzyme. Researchers believe these LMOGs may some day be used as a fast, two-step release drug delivery system.

=== Pollutant/heavy metal remediation ===
In 2010 researchers developed phase-selective gelators toward the containment and treatment of oil spills. They developed a class of LMOGs that were capable of gelling diesel, gasoline, pump, mineral, and silicone oils. These LMOGs were composed of dialkanoate derivatives of the sugar alcohols, mannitol and sorbitol. These sugar alcohol derivatives were ideal as they are biodegradable, inexpensive, and non-toxic. Once the oil was taken up by the gel fibers; it could then be separated from the gel by utilizing vacuum distillation and furthermore the gelator could be recycled.

=== Luminescent devices ===
Some gels can be used in luminescent devices such as OLEDs and/or fluorescent sensors. One example of an OLED type LMOG is mono-substituted ethynyl-pyrene. This gelator forms a stable gel with DMF, toluene, or cyclohexane while maintaining its luminescence. Another important characteristic of these gels is that they maintain high charge carrier mobility. This means that the gel can pass sufficient current in an electronic luminescent device.

Furthermore, luminescent gels can also be utilized as sensors. These sensors operate by forming a stable luminescent gel in the presence of different analytes. One example of a luminescent gel for sensing fluoride anions is presented by Prasad and Rajamalli. This example utilizes poly(aryl ether) dendrons attached to a core aryl ether with [anthracene] attached. Upon forming a stable yellow gel (under normal gelation conditions), if fluoride is introduced in the presence of the gel, the gel undergoes a gel to sol transition and becomes bright red. Being able to visually detect a color change in the presence of a dilute analyte is a promising field application of LMOG materials.

=== Chemical sensing ===
Molecular gels can be sensitized toward an external stimuli a.k.a. light, heat, or chemicals. Also, LMOG's can be sensitized by the incorporation of a receptor unit or a spectroscopically active unit into the gelator molecule. A variety of quinoxalinones were recently developed that act as a mercury sensor by forming a gel when these ligands complex to mercury. A nonplanar dihydropyridine derivative was induced to gel upon oxidizing the molecule with nitric oxide and then dissolving the oxidized ligand in DMSO/water and then heating and cooling the mixture. This gel has a useful application as it can therefore act as a nitric oxide sensor.

=== Gel Sculpture ===
Supramolecular gel also can be employed for preparing the gel sculpture. A supramolecular gelator, namely dicyclohexyammonium Boc-glycinate produced gel in nitrobenzene and exhibited self-healing and load-bearing property. This gel was used to create the gel sculptor of "Mother and Child", which is preserved in Kolkata (Indian Association for the Cultivation of Science), India.

== See also ==
Aerogel

Nanogel (insulation)mo

Gel Permeation Chromatography

Rheology
