= Random graph theory of gelation =

Mathematical theory for sol–gel processes

Random graph theory of gelation is a mathematical theory for sol–gel processes. The theory is a collection of results that generalise the Flory–Stockmayer theory, and allow identification of the gel point, gel fraction, size distribution of polymers, molar mass distribution and other characteristics for a set of many polymerising monomers carrying arbitrary numbers and types of reactive functional groups.

The theory builds upon the notion of the random graph, introduced by mathematicians Paul Erdős and Alfréd Rényi, and independently by Edgar Gilbert in the late 1950s, as well as on the generalisation of this concept known as the random graph with a fixed degree sequence. The theory has been originally developed to explain step-growth polymerisation, and adaptations to other types of polymerisation now exist. Along with providing theoretical results the theory is also constructive. It indicates that the graph-like structures resulting from polymerisation can be sampled with an algorithm using the configuration model, which makes these structures available for further examination with computer experiments.

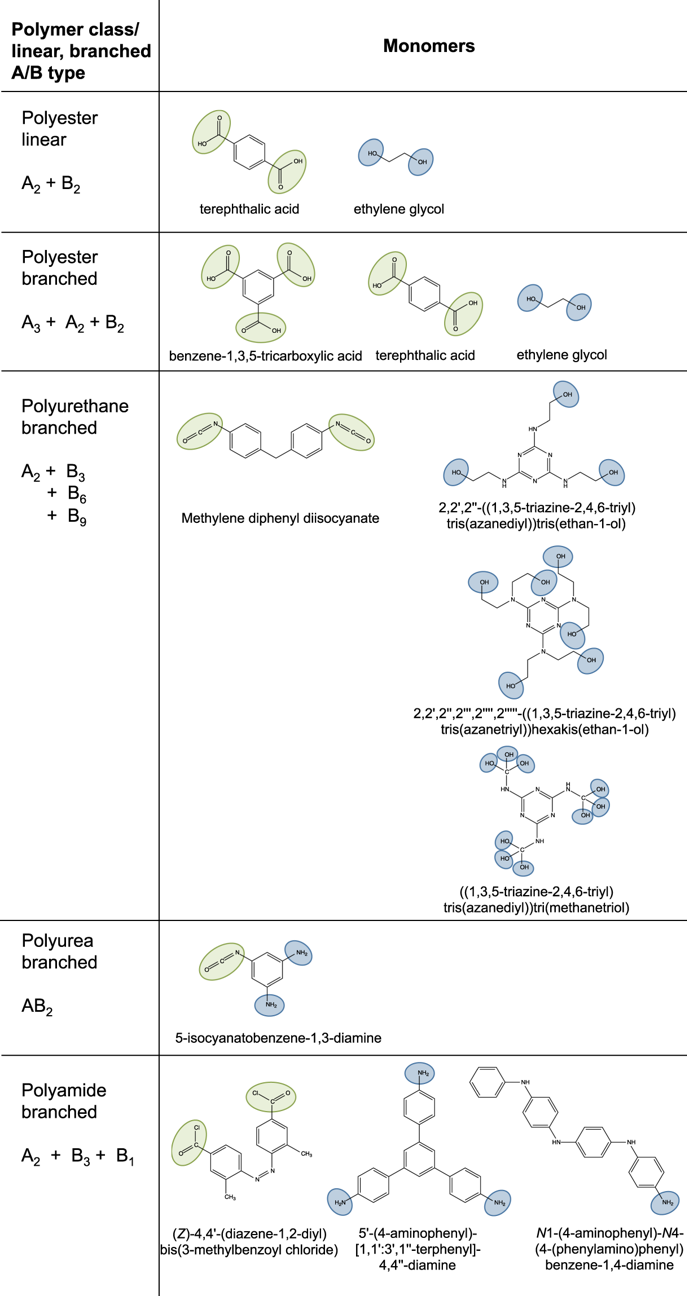
Identifying the degree distribution in step growth polymersiation

== Premises and degree distribution ==
At a given point of time, degree distribution $u(n)$, is the probability that a randomly chosen monomer has $n$ connected neighbours. The central idea of the random graph theory of gelation is that a cross-linked or branched polymer can be studied separately at two levels: 1) monomer reaction kinetics that predicts $u(n)$ and 2) random graph with a given degree distribution. The advantage of such a decoupling is that the approach allows one to study the monomer kinetics with relatively simple rate equations, and then deduce the degree distribution serving as input for a random graph model. In several cases the aforementioned rate equations have a known analytical solution.

=== One type of functional groups ===
In the case of step-growth polymerisation of monomers carrying functional groups of the same type (so called $A_1 +A_2+A_3+\cdots$ polymerisation) the degree distribution is given by: $u(n,t)=\sum_{m=n}^\infty \binom{m}{n} c(t)^n \big(1-c(t)\big)^{m-n}f_m,$ where $c(t)=\frac{\mu t}{1+\mu t}$ is bond conversion, $\mu =\sum_{m=1}^k m f_m$ is the average functionality, and $f_m$ is the initial fractions of monomers of functionality $m$. In the later expression unit reaction rate is assumed without loss of generality. According to the theory, the system is in the gel state when $c(t)>c_g$, where the gelation conversion is $c_g=\frac{\sum_{m=1}^{\infty} m f_m}{\sum_{m=1}^{\infty} (m^2-m) f_m}$. Analytical expression for average molecular weight and molar mass distribution are known too. When more complex reaction kinetics are involved, for example chemical substitution, side reactions or degradation, one may still apply the theory by computing $u(n,t)$ using numerical integration. In which case, $\sum_{n=1}^{\infty} (n^2-2n)u(n,t)>0$ signifies that the system is in the gel state at time t (or in the sol state when the inequality sign is flipped).

=== Two types of functional groups ===
When monomers with two types of functional groups A and B undergo step growth polymerisation by virtue of a reaction between A and B groups, a similar analytical results are known. See the table on the right for several examples. In this case, $f_{m,k}$ is the fraction of initial monomers with $m$ groups A and $k$ groups B. Suppose that A is the group that is depleted first. Random graph theory states that gelation takes place when $c(t)>c_g$, where the gelation conversion is $c_g=\frac{\nu_{10}}{\nu_{11}+\sqrt{ (\nu_{20}-\nu_{10})(\nu_{02}-\nu_{01})}}$ and $\nu_{i,j}=\sum_{m,k=1}^\infty m^i k^j f_{m,k}$. Molecular size distribution, the molecular weight averages, and the distribution of gyration radii have known formal analytical expressions. When degree distribution $u(n,l,t)$, giving the fraction of monomers in the network with $n$ neighbours connected via A group and $l$ connected via B group at time $t$ is solved numerically, the gel state is detected when $2 \mu \mu_{11} -\mu\mu_{02} -\mu \mu_{20} +\mu_{02}\mu_{20} - \mu_{11}^2>0$, where $\mu_{i,j}=\sum_{n,l=1}^\infty n^i l^j u(n,l,t)$ and $\mu=\mu_{01}=\mu_{10}$.

=== Generalisations ===
Known generalisations include monomers with an arbitrary number of functional group types, crosslinking polymerisation, and complex reaction networks.
