= Paul Flory =

American chemist (1910–1985)

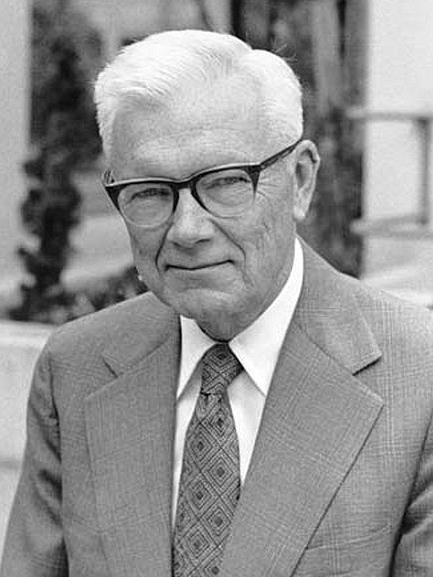
- Flory in 1973
- Born: Paul John Flory; June 19, 1910; Sterling, Illinois, U.S.
- Died: September 9, 1985 (aged 75); Big Sur, California, U.S.
- Education: Manchester University (Indiana), Ohio State University
- Known for: Polymer chemistry Polymer physics Flory convention Flory–Fox equation Flory–Huggins solution theory Flory–Rehner equation Flory–Schulz distribution Flory–Stockmayer theory Random sequential adsorption Star-shaped polymer Self-avoiding walk
- Awards: Nobel Prize for Chemistry (1974); National Medal of Science (1974); Priestley Medal (1974); Perkin Medal (1977); Elliott Cresson Medal (1971); Peter Debye Award (1969); Charles Goodyear Medal (1968); William H. Nichols Medal (1962); Colwyn medal (1954)
- Scientific career
- Fields: Physical chemistry of polymers
- Workplaces: DuPont, Stanford University, Carnegie Mellon University, Cornell University
- Doctoral advisor: Herrick L. Johnston

Paul John Flory (June 19, 1910 – September 9, 1985) was an American chemist and Nobel laureate who was known for his work in the field of polymers, or macromolecules. He was a pioneer in understanding the behavior of polymers in solution, and won the Nobel Prize in Chemistry in 1974 "for his fundamental achievements, both theoretical and experimental, in the physical chemistry of macromolecules".

== Biography ==
=== Personal life ===
Flory was born in Sterling, Illinois, on June 19, 1910 to Ezra Flory and Martha Brumbaugh. His father worked as a clergyman-educator, and his mother was a school teacher. His ancestors were German Huguenots, who traced their roots back to Alsace. He first gained an interest in science from Carl W Holl, who was a chemistry professor at Manchester College. In 1936, he married Emily Catherine Tabor. They had three children together: Susan Springer, Melinda Groom and Paul John Flory, Jr. His first position was at DuPont with Wallace Carothers. He was posthumously inducted into the Alpha Chi Sigma Hall of Fame in 2002. Flory died on September 9, 1985, following a heart attack. His wife Emily died in 2006 aged 94.

== Schooling ==
After graduating from Elgin High School in 1927, Flory received a bachelor's degree from Manchester College (now Manchester University (Indiana) in 1931 and a Ph.D. from the Ohio State University in 1934. He completed a years of master's study in organic chemistry under the supervision of Prof. Cecil E Boord, before moving into physical chemistry. Flory's doctoral thesis was on the photochemistry of nitric oxide, supervised by Prof. Herrick L. Johnston.

== Work ==
In 1934 Flory joined the Central Department of Dupont and Company working with Wallace H. Carothers. After Carothers' death in 1937, Flory worked for two years at the Basic Research Laboratory located in the University of Cincinnati. During World War II, there was a need for research to develop synthetic rubber, so Flory joined the Esso Laboratories of the Standard Oil Development Company. From 1943 to 1948 Flory worked in the polymer research team of the Goodyear Tire and Rubber Company.

In 1948, Flory gave the George Fisher Baker lectures at Cornell University, and subsequently joined the university as a professor. In 1957, Flory and his family moved to Pittsburgh, Pennsylvania, where Flory was executive director of research at the Mellon Institute of Industrial Research. In 1961, he took up a professorship at Stanford University in the department of chemistry. After retirement, Flory remained active in the world of chemistry, running research labs both in Stanford, and IBM.

== Research ==
=== Career and polymer science ===
Flory's earliest work in polymer science was in the area of polymerization kinetics at the DuPont Experimental Station. In condensation polymerization, he challenged the assumption that the reactivity of the end group decreased as the macromolecule grew, and by arguing that the reactivity was independent of the size, he was able to derive the result that the number of chains present decreased with size exponentially. In addition polymerization, he introduced the important concept of chain transfer to improve the kinetic equations and remove difficulties in understanding the polymer size distribution.

In 1938, after Carothers' death, Flory moved to the Basic Science Research Laboratory at the University of Cincinnati. There he developed a mathematical theory for the polymerization of compounds with more than two functional groups and the theory of polymer networks or gels. This led to the Flory-Stockmayer theory of gelation, which was equivalent to percolation on the Bethe lattice and represents the first paper in the percolation field.

In 1940 he joined the Linden, NJ laboratory of the Standard Oil Development Company where he developed a statistical mechanical theory for polymer mixtures. In 1943 he left to join the research laboratories of Goodyear as head of a group on polymer fundamentals. In the Spring of 1948 Peter Debye, then chairman of the chemistry department at Cornell University, invited Flory to give the annual Baker Lectures. He then was offered a position with the faculty in the Fall of the same year. He was initiated into the Tau chapter of Alpha Chi Sigma at Cornell in 1949. At Cornell he elaborated and refined his Baker Lectures into his magnum opus, Principles of Polymer Chemistry which was published in 1953 by Cornell University Press. This quickly became a standard text for all workers in the field of polymers, and is still widely used to this day.

Flory introduced the concept of excluded volume, coined by Werner Kuhn in 1934, to polymers. Excluded volume refers to the idea that one part of a long chain molecule can not occupy space that is already occupied by another part of the same molecule. Excluded volume causes the ends of a polymer chain in a solution to be further apart (on average) than they would be were there no excluded volume. The recognition that excluded volume was an important factor in analyzing long-chain molecules in solutions provided an important conceptual breakthrough, and led to the explanation of several puzzling experimental results of the day. It also led to the concept of the theta point, the set of conditions at which an experiment can be conducted that causes the excluded volume effect to be neutralized. At the theta point, the chain reverts to ideal chain characteristics – the long-range interactions arising from excluded volume are eliminated, allowing the experimenter to more easily measure short-range features such as structural geometry, bond rotation potentials, and steric interactions between near-neighboring groups. Flory correctly identified that the chain dimension in polymer melts would have the size computed for a chain in ideal solution if excluded volume interactions were neutralized by experimenting at the theta point.

Among his accomplishments are an original method for computing the probable size of a polymer in good solution, the Flory-Huggins Solution Theory, the extension of polymer physics concepts to the field of liquid crystals, and the derivation of the Flory exponent, which helps characterize the movement of polymers in solution.

=== The Flory convention ===
see Flory convention for details.

In modeling the position vectors of atoms in macromolecules it is often necessary to convert from Cartesian coordinates (x,y,z) to generalized coordinates. The Flory convention for defining the variables involved is usually employed. For an example, a peptide bond can be described by the x,y,z positions of every atom in this bond or the Flory convention can be used. Here one must know the bond lengths $l_i$, bond angles $\theta_i$, and the dihedral angles $\phi_i$. Applying a vector conversion from the Cartesian coordinates to the generalized coordinates will describe the same three-dimensional structure using the Flory convention.

== Awards and honors ==
Flory was elected to the United States National Academy of Sciences in 1953 and the American Academy of Arts and Sciences in 1957. In 1968, he received the Charles Goodyear Medal. He also received the Priestley Medal and the Golden Plate Award of the American Academy of Achievement in 1974. He received the Carl-Dietrich-Harries-Medal for commendable scientific achievements in 1977. Flory received the Nobel Prize in Chemistry in 1974 "for his fundamental achievements both theoretical and experimental, in the physical chemistry of the macromolecules." Additionally in 1974 Flory was awarded the National Medal of Science in Physical Sciences. The medal was presented to him by President Gerald Ford. This award was given to him because of his research on the "formation and structure of polymeric substances".

== Bibliography ==
- Flory, Paul. (1953) Principles of Polymer Chemistry. Cornell University Press. ISBN 0-8014-0134-8.
- Flory, Paul. (1969) Statistical Mechanics of Chain Molecules. Interscience. ISBN 0-470-26495-0. Reissued 1989. ISBN 1-56990-019-1.
- Flory, Paul. (1985) Selected Works of Paul J. Flory. Stanford Univ Press. ISBN 0-8047-1277-8.
