= Gel point =

Abrupt change in the viscosity of a solution of polymerizable materials

In polymer chemistry, the gel point is an abrupt change in the viscosity of a solution containing polymerizable components. At the gel point, a solution undergoes gelation, as reflected in a loss in fluidity. After the monomer/polymer solution has passed the gel point, internal stress builds up in the gel phase, which can lead to volume shrinkage. Gelation is characteristic of polymerizations that include crosslinkers that can form 2- or 3-dimensional networks. For example, the condensation of a dicarboxylic acid and a triol will give rise to a gel whereas the same dicarboxylic acid and a diol will not. The gel is often a small percentage of the mixture, even though it greatly influences the properties of the bulk.

== Mathematical definition ==
An infinite polymer network appears at the gel point. Assuming that it is possible to measure the extent of reaction, $p$, defined as the fraction of monomers that appear in cross-links, the gel point can be determined. The critical extent of reaction $p_c$ for the gel point to be formed is given by:

$$p_c = \frac{1}{N-1} \approx \frac{1}{N}$$

For example, a polymer with N≈200 is able to reach the gel point with only 0.5% of monomers reacting. This shows the ease at which polymers are able to form infinite networks. The critical extent of reaction for gelation can be determined as a function of the properties of the monomer mixture, $r$, $p$, and $f$:

$$p_c = \frac{1}{\sqrt{r+rp(f-2)}}$$

== See also ==
- Pour point
- Cold filter plugging point
- Petroleum
