= Developmental toxicity =

Toxicity as observed in the development of an organism

Developmental toxicity is any developmental malformation that is caused by the toxicity of a chemical or pathogen. It is the structural or functional alteration, reversible or irreversible, which interferes with homeostasis, normal growth, differentiation, development or behavior. Developmental toxicity is caused by environmental factors, things like drugs, alcohol, diet, toxic chemicals, and physical factors that alter the developmental process.

More factors causing developmental toxicity are radiation, infections (e.g. rubella), maternal metabolic imbalances (e.g. alcoholism, diabetes, folic acid deficiency), drugs (e.g. anticancer drugs, tetracyclines, many hormones, thalidomide), and toxic environmental chemicals (e.g. mercury, lead, dioxins, PBDEs, HBCD, tobacco smoke).In addition, it is the study of adverse effects on the development of the organism that can result from exposure to toxic agents before conception, during fetal development, or even following birth.

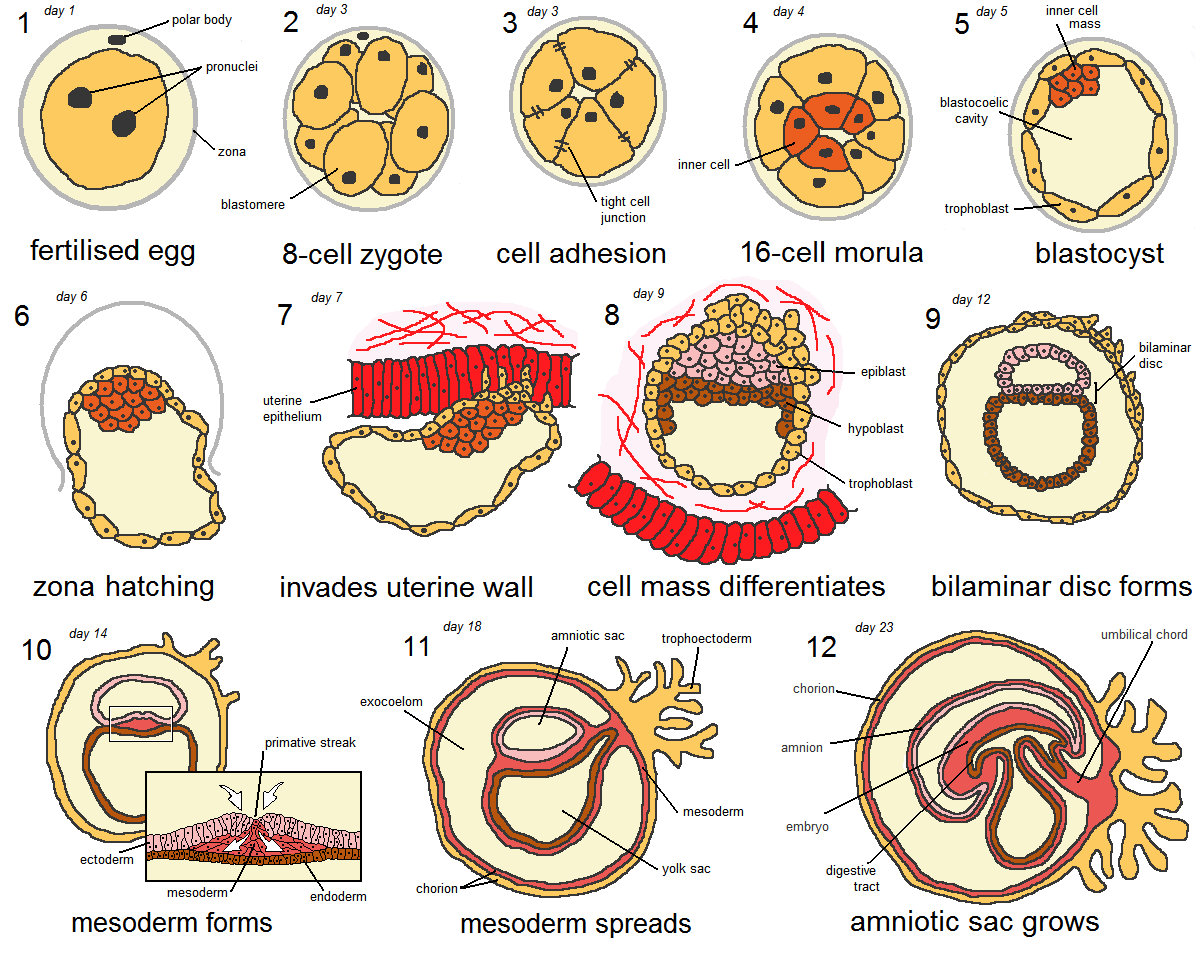
The first few weeks of embryogenesis in humans. Beginning at the fertilized egg, ending with the closing of the neural tube. The embryogenesis is the most crucial time for the action of any teratogenic substances resulting in birth defects.

Certain pathogens are also included since the toxins they secrete are known to cause adverse effects on the development of the organism when the mother or fetus is infected. In the past there was a field of study that looked at primarily structural congenital abnormalities, which is another way of saying physical deformities. This field of study has widely been replaced by what is known now as teratology to enable inclusion of a more diverse spectrum of congenital disorders. The substances that cause developmental toxicity from embryonic stage to birth are called teratogens. The effect of the developmental toxicants depends on the type of substance, dose, duration, and time of the exposure. The first few weeks of embryogenesis in humans is more susceptible to these agents.

The embryogenesis is the most crucial time for the action of any teratogenic substances to result in birth defects. Once fertilization has taken place, the toxicants in the environment can pass through the mother to the developing embryo or fetus across the placental barrier. The fetus is at greatest risk during the first 14th to 60th day of the pregnancy when the major organs are being formed. However, depending on the type of toxicant and amount of exposure, a fetus can be exposed to toxicants at any time during pregnancy, but have different effects. For example, exposure to a particular toxicant at one time in the pregnancy may result in organ damage and at another time in the pregnancy could cause death of the fetus and miscarriage.

There are a number of chemicals, biological agents (such as bacteria and viruses), and physical agents (such as radiation) used in a variety of workplaces that are known to cause developmental disorders. Developmental disorders can include a wide range of physical abnormalities, such as bone or organ deformities, or behavioral and learning problems, such as an intellectual disability. Exposures to some chemicals during pregnancy can lead to the development of cancer later in life, called transgenerational carcinogens. Exposure to toxicants during the second and third trimesters of a pregnancy can lead to slow fetal growth and result in low birth weight.

== History ==
Toxicology research is the study of the adverse effects of chemicals or physical agents on living organisms. The scientific study of poisons dates to Ancient Egypt, China, and Greece. Ebers Papyrus from 1500 BCE contains information on many poisons including hemlock. Shen Hung (2605 BCE, China) tested hundreds of herbs and wrote the first Pharmacopoeia. Mathieu Orfila, a 19th-century Spanish physician and scientist, is a founder of modern toxicology that autopsied poison victims to evaluate target organ specific effects (liver, kidney, GI tract, brain, etc.).

Researchers have been able to ascertain toxicity associated with abnormal development with new breakthrough in developmental biology. Recognition of the developmental toxic effects of various molecules is a recent development. Unfortunately, the damage caused by these toxicants can be very subtle, and even when identified it can be difficult to persuade lawmakers to enact change.

Terato means monster in Greek. Until the 18th century, the preformism theory was accepted by which abnormal growth was considered as deformations. The 19th century saw developmental in descriptive embryology where abnormalities were now considered as malformations or errors during a developmental process giving rise to the concept of teratogenesis. By the 20th century, the concept of epigenesis the interaction between a genetic program and environment was established and in the second half of the 20th century researchers had evidence that environmental factors can cause malformations and even trans-generational effects.

This type of specific research that looks for malformations in fetal development is called Developmental and Reproductive Toxicology (DART).

== Testing and risk assessment ==
Testing for developmental toxicant is done in different stages:

- Fertilization to implantation - Fertilization followed by increase in cell number, cleavage and cavitation to form the blastocyst which gets implanted. Toxicant exposure at this stage usually prevents implantation and results in death. e.g. DDT, nicotine
- Implantation to gastrulation - The three germ layers are formed and the cells start migrating out to initiate organogenesis. This is most sensitive stage for alcohol toxicity.
- Organogenesis - It is the formation of limbs, organs, nervous system, urinary and genital systems by the process of cell differentiation, migration and cell interactions from the 3rd to 8th week of human gestation. e.g. DES
- Morphogenesis - Includes the stages of growth and physiological maturation from week 8 until birth. Teratogenic effects results in deformations and rather than malformations in the fetus.
- Post Natal to puberty - Environmental toxicant exposures.

=== DART (Developmental and Reproductive Toxicology) ===
DART is the specific research of looking for malformations from the toxicity of chemicals, medications, pesticides, dietary supplements, etc. The National Toxicology Program (NTP) has been conducting DART research for chemicals that have not been FDA approved or undergone the appropriate research for human offspring.

The research is conducted by using pregnant animals and exposing them to a certain chemical, medication, drug, pesticide, etc. throughout their pregnancy and then complete teratology on the fetuses to look for malformations. These malformations can be anything from a tissue malformation to a skeletal malformation. They can also allow the animal to deliver the offspring to look for malformations in growing animals. These malformations can be anything from behaviors, intellect, sexual maturity such as testicular development, vaginal opening, and the ability to reproduce.

Because of the complexity of the embryo-fetal development, including the maternal-fetal interactions during gestation, it is important to understand the mechanism of toxicity and test the toxic effect in up to two species before confirming the substance to be a developmental toxicant. Embryo have different critical periods for the organ formation from day 15 to day 60 and hence the susceptibility to toxicant injury is directly related to the period of development.

== Risk Assessment Guidelines ==
Risk Assessment is defined as a process to make a scientifically sound judgement to identify the potential toxicity cause in human by a substance. As defined by National Research Council, Risk assessment process is composed of hazard identification, dose response, exposure assessment, and risk characterization.

=== Hazard Identification ===
There are multiple possible endpoints to developmental toxicity that can be used to identify the manifestations of developmental toxicity with manifestations of developmental toxicity can be, but not limited to, death, maternal toxicity, and altered growth. The manifestation of developmental toxicity can be measured in laboratory animals in a research study using protocols that is provided by developmental toxicity guidelines or other study's protocol; these manifestations can be found within human study as well.

In laboratory animal studies, the substance being studied is commonly introduced to pregnant animals appropriate to the study in different dosage during major organogenesis via oral route of exposure and maternal response to the substance was gather as well as other data such as weight, age, and health status to reduces bias. Route of exposure, parentals exposure, and other variables can be manipulated depending on the studies. The data are then used to interpret the endpoints of the manifestations above such as the endpoint of maternal toxicity can includes fertility index, mortality, gestation length, and body weight change, and endpoint of developmental toxicity (altered growth) can include stillbirth rate, survival rate, malformation rate, and resorption rates.

Guidelines for laboratory animal are, but not limited to, several similar aspects of the study to previous developmental toxicity, replicated study provides confidence in the conclusion, critical periods for disruption range between prenatal to postnatal sexual maturation, and postnatal data should also considered exposure to maternal interactions.

In human studies, epidemiology studies and case studies are used to collect data. General design consideration of human studies includes the ability of the study to detect the true effects, potential bias in data collection due to other people not participating in data collection either by choice or not, other risk factors were taken into consideration to reduce bias, and statistical factors that can lead to overestimation or underestimation of the true effects.

=== Dose Response ===
Human and animal studies are both used to determine the dose-response relationship; however, due to limited amount of human data, animal studies are most commonly used to determine the dose-response relationship of developmental toxicity. The dosage the developmental toxicity agent is usually near maternally toxic range. It is needed to be note that dose-response relationship may not be observed clearly for some endpoints.

The use of NOAEL and LOAEL are to evaluate the dose-response relationship for developmental toxicity with NOAEL identifies the highest dose where there are no significant adverse effects are observed while LOAEL identifies the lowest dose where there are significant adverse effects are observed. However, due to limitation from both NOAEL and LOAEL such as only focusing on one experimental dose and not incorporate of the slopes, Benchmark dose is developed to identify the incidence level within or near the range.

Certain principles are used to determined NOAEL, LOAEL, and Benchmark dose. For one, an assumption of a single exposure at critical time will produce an adverse side effect. Second is that NOAEL, LOAEL, and Benchmark dose for developmental, maternal, and/or adult toxicity for pregnant female, lactating female, or paternal male (if applicable) are compared to other adult toxicity such as nonpregnant female or adult males.

=== Exposure Assessment ===
Exposure Assessment describes the magnitude, route of exposure, duration, and frequency of the exposure to the agents. There are some unique considerations for developmental toxicity. First, the exposure from placental transfer, breast milk or both parents being exposed to the agent before conception needs to be taken into consideration. Second, the duration and periods of exposure are measured in developmental stages such as first, second, or third trimester. Finally, exposure through environmental factor also needs to be taken into consideration.

=== Risk Characterization ===
Risk characterization is the cumulative and integration of risk assessment process to communicate the risk to the risk manager and then to the public. Integration of risk process should include a quality conclusion of the risk assessment process, discussion of dose-response relationship with endpoints using data and graphs and gives quality overview of exposure assessment. To communicate the risk, there are multiple ways to describe it such as providing a "what if" scenario where the risk assessments process for the developmental toxicity agent is integrated, estimation of exposure to the agent, risk characterization of those that are highly exposed or highly susceptible to the agent, and other risk descriptor if applicable.

== Toxicity effects ==
Developmental toxicity is the alterations of the developmental processes (organogenesis, morphogenesis) rather than functional alterations of already developed organs. The effects of the toxicants depends on the dose, threshold and duration. The effects of toxicity are:

1. Minor structural deformities - e.g. Anticonvulsant drugs, Warfarin, Retinoic Acid derivatives
2. Major structural deformities - e.g. DES (diethylstilbestrol), cigarette smoking
3. Growth Retardation - e.g. Alcohol, Polychlorinated Biphenyls
4. Functional alterations - e.g. Retinoic Acid derivatives, Polychlorinated Biphenyls, Phenobarbitol, Lead
5. Death- e.g. Rubella, ACE inhibitors

== Examples ==
=== Maternal irradiation and congenital malformations ===
One of the first environmentally induced congenital malformations in humans were recognized as a result of maternal irradiation. Hiroshima (1953) and Nagasaki (1955) had ascertained this fact for the first time based on the records of births occurring before May 31, 1946, but after the atomic bombing (August 6, 1945, in Hiroshima; August 9, 1945, in Nagasaki). A 20% increase in microcephaly frequency was seen in children with in-utero radiation exposure during the first trimester of the pregnancy (Miller 1956, 1968). Sensitivity to these radiations was seen to be predominantly high during the 7–15th week of gestation.

Two pertinent points were observed during this study:

1. The severity and frequency of the congenital abnormalities seen increased with dose of radiation which depended on the closeness to the source or explosion.
2. It was determined that there were critical periods of pregnancy when these exposures had the maximum effect on the fetal development.

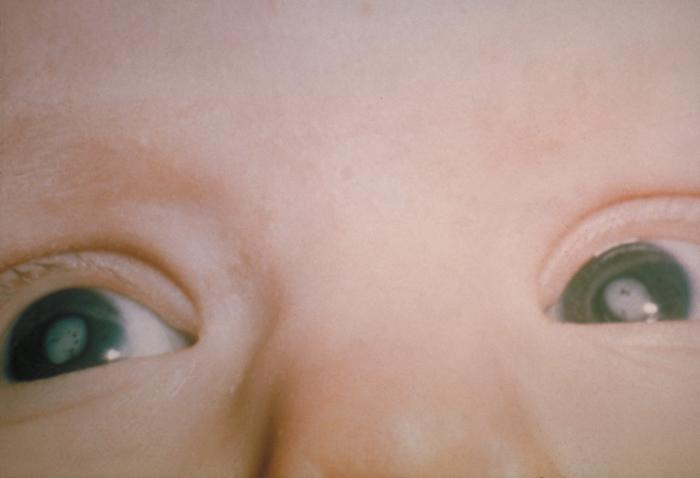
Cataracts in a child's eyes due to congenital rubella syndrome

=== Congenital rubella syndrome ===
Rubella was the first recognized human epidemic of malformations. Following a widespread epidemic of rubella infection in 1940, Norman Gregg, an Australian ophthalmologist, reported in 1941 the occurrence of congenital cataracts among 78 infants born following maternal rubella infection in early pregnancy. This indicated that the virus had to cross the placental barrier to reach the fetus and cause malformations. The time of exposure to the virus also had a direct impact on the incidence of congenital malformations with exposure during week 4, 5–8 and 9–12 weeks of pregnancy caused 61%, 26% and 8% of congenital malformations. This was the first published recognition of congenital rubella syndrome. The progeny had congenital eye, heart and ear defects as well as intellectual disability.

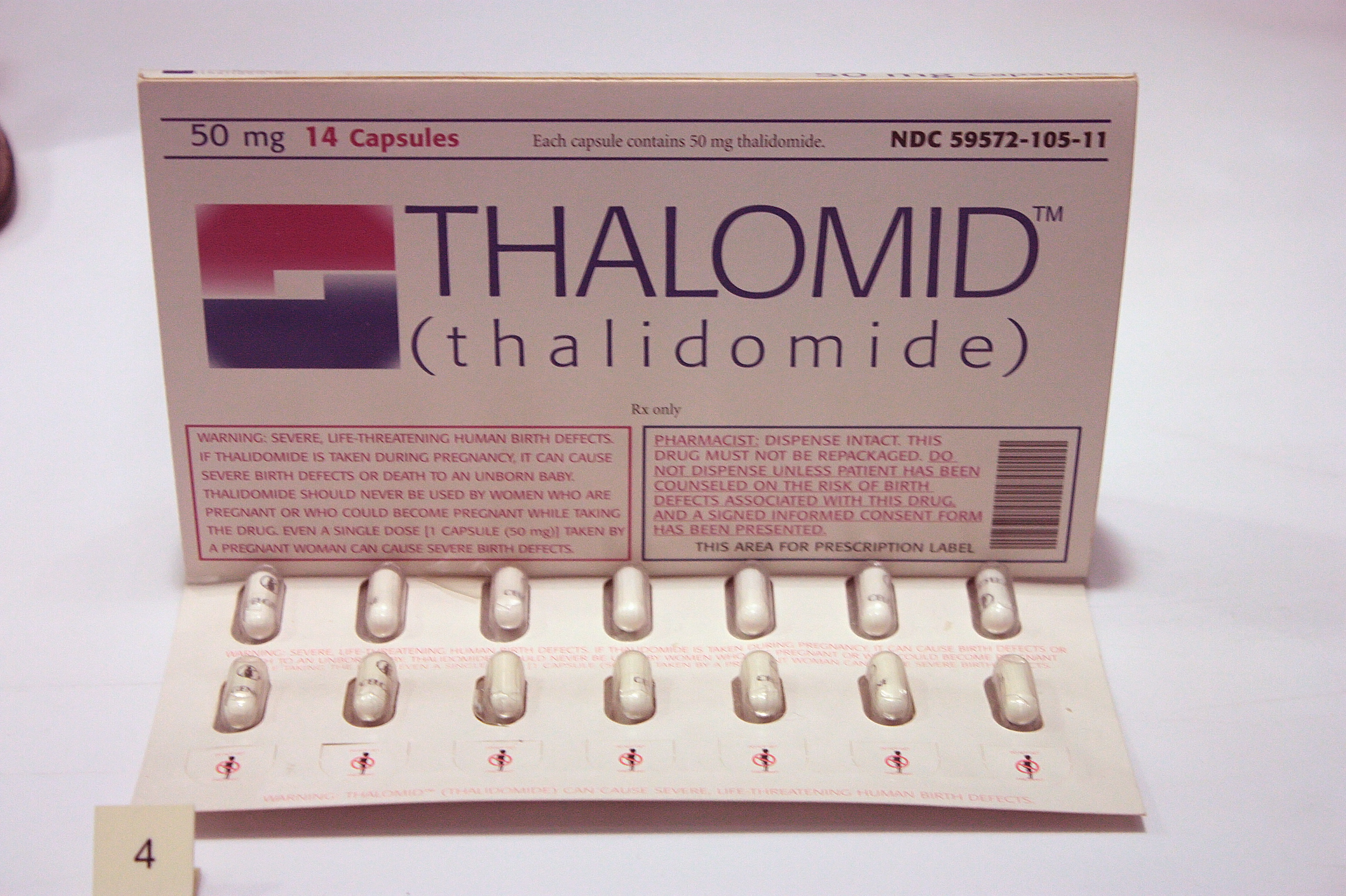
Prescription Thalidomide

=== Thalidomide Tragedy (1950) ===
Thalidomide was used as treatment for cancers, leprosy and HIV, however, the drug was extensively used for the treatment of nausea in pregnant women in the late 1950s and early 1960s until it became apparent in the 1960s that it resulted in severe birth defects. Fetus that were exposed to thalidomide while in the womb experienced limb malformation by which the limb was not developed or appeared as stumps. Other effects also seen with thalidomide exposure included deformed eyes and hearts, deformed alimentary and urinary tracts, blindness and deafness. The thalidomide tragedy marked a turning point in toxicity testing, as it prompted United States and international regulatory agencies to develop systematic toxicity testing protocol. The effects of thalidomide led to important discoveries in the biochemical pathways of limb development. Many thalidomide victims and their families are still seeking justice for the struggles that they had to endure. The most notable way that survivors are fighting for justice is by forming Thalidomide survivor societies. These societies provide a safe space for Thalidomide survivors to freely share their stories and rally together to fight for social change as well as enforce strict laws on drug testing and control. The most notable society in the United States is the US Thalidomide Survivors Society. This society focuses on the survivors within the United States, while also promoting other international societies.

=== Effects on neurulation ===
Neurulation is one of the most important stages in the development of vertebrates. It is the process of formation of a flat neural plate which then convolutes to form the hollow neural tube. It is considered to be one of the main targets of developmental toxicity and defects in neurulation is a common consequence of toxicant exposure and results in large proportion of human defects. Neurulation exposure to developmental toxicity is caused by the increased rate of cell proliferation and the ventral to dorsal migration of neuroepithelial cells. Epigenetic factors disrupt the normal process of the formation of the neural tube causing Neural Tube Defects (NTD). This leads to spina bifida, a common human defect.

Facial characteristics that suggest the diagnosis of FAS

=== Fetal alcohol syndrome (FAS) ===
Fetal alcohol spectrum disorders (FASD) is a term that constitutes the set of conditions that can occur in a person whose mother drank alcohol during the course of pregnancy. These effects can include physical and cognitive problems. FASD patient usually has a combination of these problems. Extent of effect depends on exposure frequency, dose and rate of ethanol elimination from amniotic fluid. Research indicates that ethanol interferes with critical cell signaling pathways, leading to altered brain structure and function, particularly affecting the corpus callosum, hippocampus, and cerebellum. FAS disrupts normal development of the fetus, which may cause certain developmental stages to be delayed, skipped, or immaturely developed. Since alcohol elimination is slow in a fetus than in an adult and the fact that they do not have a developed liver to metabolize the alcohol, alcohol levels tend to remain high and stay in the fetus longer. Birth defects associated with prenatal exposure to alcohol can occur in the first three to eight weeks of pregnancy before a woman even knows that she is pregnant.

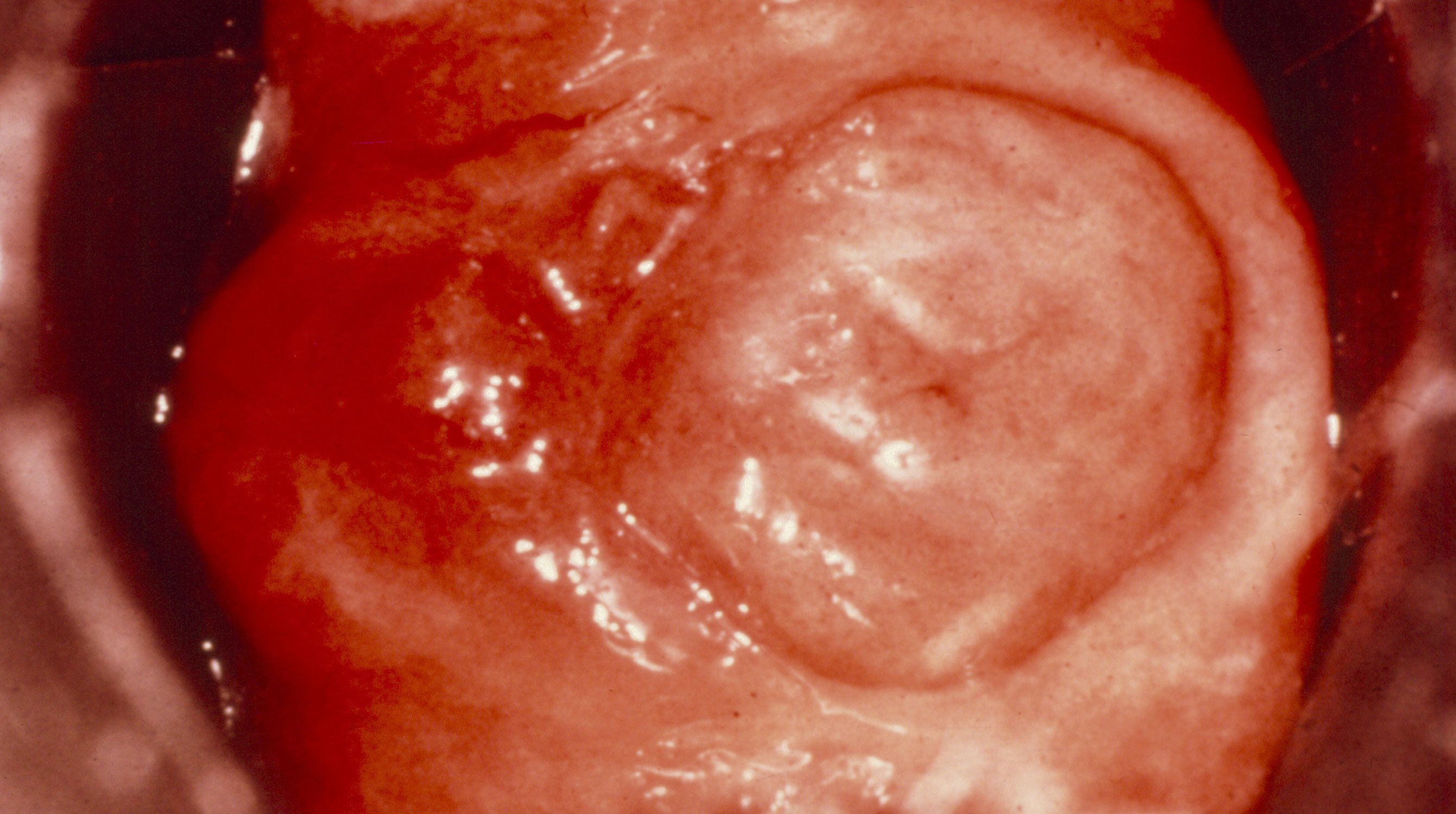
Diethylstilbestrol (DES) cervix. The cockscomb, collar, and pseudopolyp of cervix. Cockscomb (hoods) are markedly enlarged folds of cervical stroma and epithelium . Low, broad folds are collars (rims). A pseudopoly is that portion of the cervix which is medial to a constricting band (sulcus) and has on superficial examination the appearance of a polyp.

=== DES (diethylstilbestrol) ===
DES (diethylstilbestrol) is a drug that mimics estrogen, a female hormone. From 1938 until 1971, doctors prescribed this drug to help some pregnant women who had had miscarriages or premature deliveries on the theory that miscarriages and premature births occurred because some pregnant women did not produce enough estrogen naturally to sustain the pregnancy for full term. An estimated 5–10 million pregnant women and the children born during this period were exposed to DES. Currently, DES is known to increase the risk of breast cancer, and cause a variety of birth-related adverse outcomes exposed female offsprings such as spontaneous abortion, second-trimester pregnancy loss, preterm delivery, stillbirth, neonatal death, sub/infertility and cancer of reproductive tissues. DES is an important developmental toxicant which links the fetal basis of adult disease.

=== Methylmercury ===
Methylmercury and inorganic mercury is excreted in human breast milk and infants are particularly susceptible to toxicity due to this compound. The fetus and infant are especially vulnerable to mercury exposures with special interest in the development of the CNS since it can easily cross across the placental barrier, accumulate within the placenta and fetus as the fetus cannot eliminate mercury and have a negative effect on the fetus even if the mother does not show symptoms. Mercury causes damage to the nervous system resulting from prenatal or early postnatal exposure and is very likely to be permanent.

=== Chlorpyrifos ===
It is an organophosphate insecticide that acts on the nervous system of insects by inhibiting acetylcholinesterase but are moderately toxic to humans. But it is known have developmental effects appear in fetuses and children even at very small doses. It has been shown to cause abnormal reflexes in neonates, poorer mental development in 2 and 3 year olds, poorer verbal IQ in 3 1/2 and 5 year old and pervasive developmental disorder in 2, 3 and 3 1/2 year olds.

=== Environmental endocrine disruptors ===
Endocrine disruptors are molecules that alter the structure or function of the endocrine system. These chemicals can act as a part of developmental toxicity because they can alter hormonal pathways in the endocrine system, leading to negative health effects. One of the most common endocrine disruptor is Bisphenol A (BPA). BPA is often found in human waste material, specifically plastics. This means that BPA is also used in water bottles, which can be dangerous when the chemicals from the plastics leach into the purified drinking water for human consumption. More endocrine disrupting chemicals include forms of phthalic acid esters that are used as plasticizers. Both BPA and phthalic acid esters are found in waterways. Prenatal BPA exposure is associated with aggression and neurobehaviour changes. Another common toxin is pyrifluquinazon, which is an insecticide used to control pests. Vinclozolin is also an endocrine disrupting chemical; it is a fungicide used on produce to help them have a longer shelf life . Endocrine disruptors may have different effects depending on the extent of the exposure. Many endocrine disrupting chemicals are not only found in plastic, but also found in many hygiene products, cosmetics, cleaners, food, and much more. These toxins can have a lead role in human health as they can lead to metabolic diseases, infertility issues, and even neurodevelopmental disorders.

=== Dietary supplements ===
Many dietary supplements are approved without FDA approval due to them being listed as "food" instead of drugs. As long as the product is labeled "dietary supplement", then it is free to be put on the market without the FDA's approval. A dietary supplement is a product meant for consumption that, among other criteria, includes a "dietary ingredient" designed to enhance the diet. The phrase "dietary ingredient" encompasses a variety of elements, including vitamins and minerals; herbs and other plant-based substances. However, many of them contain chemicals that have not been tested and approved for use, especially for children and pregnant women. It is important to investigate and research any type of dietary supplement before taking it during pregnancy. Some dietary supplements that have been found to have harmful effects are listed below.

=== Lithium ===
Lithium is a medicine prescribed to help with bipolar disorder, but it is known to cause harm to developing babies when given to pregnant mothers. There is a common issue known as Ebstein's anomaly, where the baby's heart does not form correctly because of lithium exposure. The first trimester is the most dangerous time, as that is when the baby's heart is forming.

Lithium harms the baby's development by changing how cell signaling works in a pathway called Wnt signaling that helps the heart and other organs form in the correct way. Lithium exposure interrupts this signaling and can cause the heart's valves or chambers to develop abnormally. It can also affect brain or spine development as well.

=== Methimazole ===
Methimazole is a medication that is prescribed to treat hyperthyroidism. If a pregnant woman takes this medication it is known to cause harm to developing babies. It has been linked to a group of birth defects known as methimazole embryopathy. These defects are known to be associated with the face, skin, and nose through disruption of the hormone production of the thyroid. The first trimester is the time when it causes the most harm because that is when these are parts of the baby are forming.

== Major developmental toxicants ==
Some of the known developmental toxicants can be grouped under the following categories:

Reproductive toxins: These are substances that can negatively affect reproductive health, which includes fertility, pregnancy, and fetal development.

- Aminopterin
- Methotrexate
- Androgen
- ACE inhibitor
- Antituberculous drug
- Caffeine
- Chloramphenicol
- Chloroform
- Ciproflaxin
- Cocaine
- Codeine
- Coumarin
- Diethylstilbestrol
- Ethanol
- Ibuprofen
- Insulin shock therapy
- Isotretinoin
- Levofloxacin
- Primaquine
- Streptomycin
- Sulfonamides
- Thalidomide
- Trimethoprim
- Vitamin A
- Vitamin D
- Warfarin

Anti-convulsants: These are medications used to treat various neurological conditions, such as epilepsy. Although they can treat these disorders, they are known for being harmful to fetal growth and development.

- Diphenylhydantoin
- Trimethadione
- Paramethadione
- Valproic Acid
- Carbamazepine

Chemicals:

- Lead
- Gasoline
- Methylmercury
- Mercury
- Polychlorinated biphenyl
- Toluene toxicity
- Various types of Formaldehydes, such as Paraformaldehyde and Methylene glycol
- Quaternium 15

Biological agents:

- Cytomegalovirus
- Rubella
- Herpes simplex virus
- HIV
- Syphilis
- Toxoplasmosis
- Varicella zoster virus
- Venezuelan equine encephalitis virus

Lifestyle:

- Tobacco smoking
- Alcoholism

Maternal metabolic imbalances:

- Cretinism
- Diabetes mellitus
- Folic acid deficiency
- Hyperthermia
- Phenylketonuria
- Rheumatic disorder

== Sources ==
- J.M. Rogers; R.J. Kavlock (2001). "Developmental toxicology". In C.D. Klaassen (ed.). Casarett & Doull's Toxicology (6th ed.). New York: McGraw-Hill. pp. 351–386. ISBN 978-0-07-134721-1.
