= C3H3NO3 =

The molecular formula C_{3}H_{3}NO_{3} (molar mass: 101.061 g/mol) may refer to:

- 2,4-Oxazolidinedione
- Glycine N-carboxyanhydride (2,5-Oxazolidinedione)
