= Leuchs =

Leuchs is a surname of German origin. People with that name include:

- Hermann Leuchs (1879-1945), German organic chemist
  - Leuchs anhydride, a class of chemical compounds
- Kashi Leuchs (born 1978), New Zealand cross country mountain biker
- Jean Leuchs (born 1995), Brazilian Brewer

== See also ==
- Leuch, a surname
