= Birth defect =

Condition present at birth regardless of cause

- Other names: Congenital disorder, congenital disease, congenital deformity, congenital anomaly
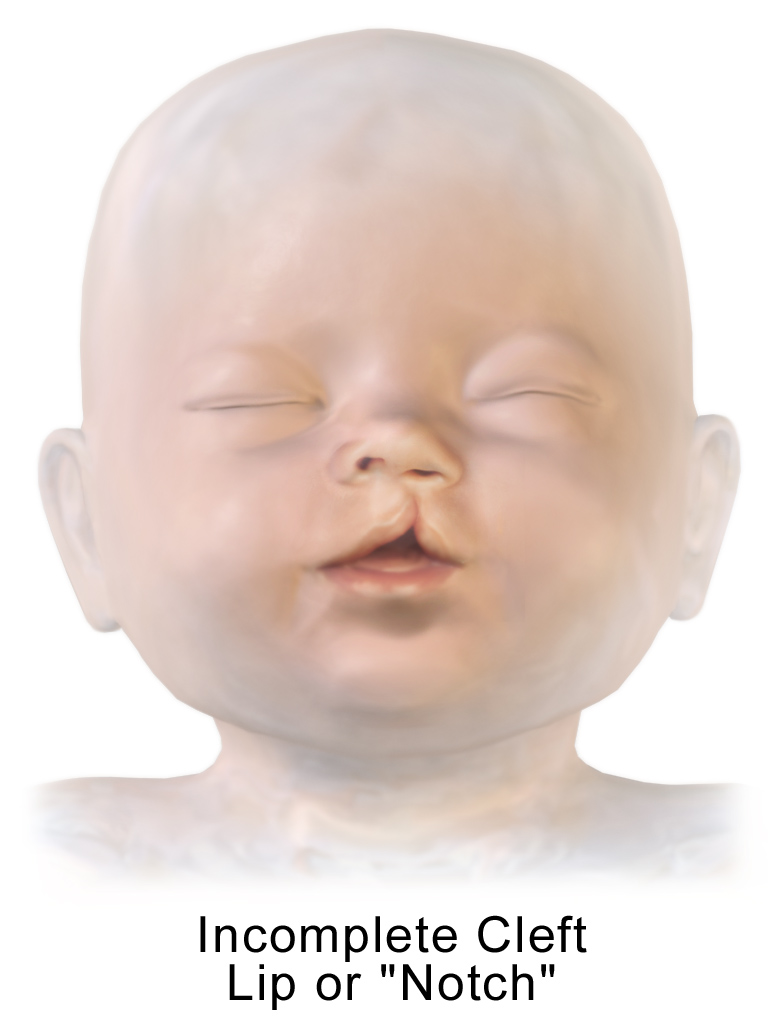
- Incomplete cleft lip
- Specialty: Medical genetics, pediatrics
- Symptoms: Physical disability, intellectual disability, developmental disability
- Usual onset: Present at birth
- Types: Structural, functional
- Causes: Genetics, exposure to certain medications or chemicals, certain infections during pregnancy
- Risk factors: Insufficient folic acid, drinking alcohol or smoking, poorly controlled diabetes
- Treatment: Therapy, medication, surgery, assistive technology
- Frequency: 3% of newborns (US)
- Deaths: 628,000 (2015)

A birth defect (Note: Also known as a congenital disorder, congenital disease, congenital deformity, or congenital anomaly.) is an abnormal condition that is present at birth, regardless of its cause. Birth defects may result in disabilities that may be physical, intellectual, or developmental. The disabilities can range from mild to severe. Birth defects are divided into two main types: structural disorders in which problems are seen with the shape of a body part and functional disorders in which problems exist with how a body part works. Functional disorders include metabolic and degenerative disorders. Some birth defects include both structural and functional disorders.

Birth defects may result from genetic or chromosomal disorders, exposure to certain medications or chemicals, or certain infections during pregnancy. Risk factors include folate deficiency, drinking alcohol or smoking during pregnancy, poorly controlled diabetes, and a mother over the age of 35 years. Many birth defects are believed to involve multiple factors. Birth defects may be visible at birth or diagnosed by screening tests. A number of defects can be detected before birth by different prenatal tests.

Treatment varies depending on the defect in question. This may include therapy, medication, surgery, or assistive technology. Birth defects affected about 96 million people as of 2015. In the United States, they occur in about 3% of newborns. They resulted in about 628,000 deaths in 2015, down from 751,000 in 1990. The types with the greatest numbers of deaths are congenital heart disease (303,000), followed by neural tube defects (65,000).

== Classification ==
Much of the language used for describing congenital conditions predates genome mapping, and structural conditions are often considered separately from other congenital conditions. Many metabolic conditions are now known to have subtle structural expression, and structural conditions often have genetic links. Still, congenital conditions are often classified on a structural basis, organized when possible by primary organ system affected.

=== Primarily structural ===
Several terms are used to describe congenital abnormalities. (Some of these are also used to describe noncongenital conditions, and more than one term may apply in an individual condition.)

==== Terminology ====
- A congenital physical anomaly is an abnormality of the structure of a body part. It may or may not be perceived as a problem condition. Many, if not most, people have one or more minor physical anomalies if examined carefully. Examples of minor anomalies can include curvature of the fifth finger (clinodactyly), a third nipple, tiny indentations of the skin near the ears (preauricular pits), shortness of the fourth metacarpal or metatarsal bones, or dimples over the lower spine (sacral dimples). Some minor anomalies may be clues to more significant internal abnormalities.
- Birth defect is a widely used term for a congenital malformation, i.e. a congenital, physical anomaly that is recognizable at birth, and which is significant enough to be considered a problem. According to the Centers for Disease Control and Prevention (CDC), most birth defects are believed to be caused by a complex mix of factors including genetics, environment, and behaviors, though many birth defects have no known cause. An example of a birth defect is cleft palate, which occurs during the fourth through seventh weeks of gestation. Body tissue and special cells from each side of the head grow toward the center of the face. They join to make the face. A cleft means a split or separation; the "roof" of the mouth is called the palate.
- A congenital malformation is a physical anomaly that is deleterious, i.e. a structural defect perceived as a problem. A typical combination of malformations affecting more than one body part is referred to as a malformation syndrome.
- Some conditions are due to abnormal tissue development:
  - A malformation is associated with a disorder of tissue development. Malformations often occur in the first trimester.
  - A dysplasia is a disorder at the organ level that is due to problems with tissue development.
- Conditions also can arise after tissue is formed:
  - A deformation is a condition arising from mechanical stress to normal tissue. Deformations often occur in the second or third trimester, and can be due to oligohydramnios.
  - A disruption involves breakdown of normal tissues.
- When multiple effects occur in a specified order, they are known as a sequence. When the order is not known, it is a syndrome.

==== Examples of primarily structural congenital disorders ====
A limb anomaly is called a dysmelia. These include all forms of limbs anomalies, such as amelia, ectrodactyly, phocomelia, polymelia, polydactyly, syndactyly, polysyndactyly, oligodactyly, brachydactyly, achondroplasia, congenital aplasia or hypoplasia, amniotic band syndrome, and cleidocranial dysostosis.

Congenital heart defects include patent ductus arteriosus, atrial septal defect, ventricular septal defect, and tetralogy of Fallot.

Congenital anomalies of the nervous system include neural tube defects such as spina bifida, encephalocele, and anencephaly. Other congenital anomalies of the nervous system include the Arnold–Chiari malformation, the Dandy–Walker malformation, hydrocephalus, microencephaly, megalencephaly, lissencephaly, polymicrogyria, holoprosencephaly, and agenesis of the corpus callosum.

Congenital anomalies of the gastrointestinal system include numerous forms of stenosis and atresia, and perforation, such as gastroschisis.

Congenital anomalies of the kidney and urinary tract include renal parenchyma, kidneys, and urinary collecting system.

Defects can be bilateral or unilateral, and different defects often coexist in an individual child.

=== Primarily metabolic ===
A congenital metabolic disease is also referred to as an inborn error of metabolism. Most of these are single-gene defects, usually heritable. Many affect the structure of body parts, but some simply affect the function.

=== Other ===
Other well-defined genetic conditions may affect the production of hormones, receptors, structural proteins, and ion channels.

== Causes ==
=== Alcohol exposure ===
The mother's consumption of alcohol during pregnancy can cause a continuum of various permanent birth defects: craniofacial abnormalities, brain damage, intellectual disability, heart disease, kidney abnormality, skeletal anomalies, ocular abnormalities. There is no known safe amount of alcohol to consume while pregnant.

The prevalence of children affected is estimated at least 1% in U.S. as well in Canada.

Very few studies have investigated the links between paternal alcohol use and offspring health.

However, recent animal research has shown a correlation between paternal alcohol exposure and decreased offspring birth weight. Behavioral and cognitive disorders, including difficulties with learning and memory, hyperactivity, and lowered stress tolerance have been linked to paternal alcohol ingestion. The compromised stress management skills of animals whose male parent was exposed to alcohol are similar to the exaggerated responses to stress that children with fetal alcohol syndrome display because of maternal alcohol use. These birth defects and behavioral disorders were found in cases of both long- and short-term paternal alcohol ingestion. In the same animal study, paternal alcohol exposure was correlated with a significant difference in organ size and the increased risk of the offspring displaying ventricular septal defects at birth.

=== Toxic substances ===
Substances whose toxicity can cause congenital disorders are called teratogens, and include certain pharmaceutical and recreational drugs in pregnancy, as well as many environmental toxins in pregnancy.

A review published in 2010 identified six main teratogenic mechanisms associated with medication use: folate antagonism, neural crest cell disruption, endocrine disruption, oxidative stress, vascular disruption, and specific receptor- or enzyme-mediated teratogenesis.

An estimated 10% of all birth defects are caused by prenatal exposure to a teratogenic agent. These exposures include medication or drug exposures, maternal infections and diseases, and environmental and occupational exposures. Paternal smoking has also been linked to an increased risk of birth defects and childhood cancer for the offspring, where the paternal germline undergoes oxidative damage due to cigarette use. Teratogen-caused birth defects are potentially preventable. Nearly 50% of pregnant women have been exposed to at least one medication during gestation. During pregnancy, a woman can also be exposed to teratogens from contaminated clothing or toxins within the seminal fluid of a partner. An additional study found that of 200 individuals referred for genetic counseling for a teratogenic exposure, 52% were exposed to more than one potential teratogen.

The United States Environmental Protection Agency studied 1,065 chemical and drug substances in their ToxCast program (part of the CompTox Chemicals Dashboard) using in silico modeling and a human pluripotent stem cell-based assay to predict in vivo developmental intoxicants based on changes in cellular metabolism following chemical exposure. Findings of the study published in 2020 were that 19% of the 1065 chemicals yielded a prediction of developmental toxicity.

==== Medications and supplements ====
Probably, the most well-known teratogenic drug is thalidomide. It was developed near the end of the 1950s by Chemie Grünenthal as a sleep-inducing aid and antiemetic. Because of its ability to prevent nausea, it was prescribed for pregnant women in almost 50 countries worldwide between 1956 and 1962. Until William McBride published the study leading to its withdrawal from the market in 1961, about 8,000 to 10,000 severely malformed children were born. The most typical disorders induced by thalidomide were reductional deformities of the long bones of the extremities. Phocomelia, otherwise a rare deformity, therefore helped to recognise the teratogenic effect of the new drug. Among other malformations caused by thalidomide were those of ears, eyes, brain, kidney, heart, and digestive and respiratory tracts; 40% of the prenatally affected children died soon after birth. As thalidomide is used today as a treatment for multiple myeloma and leprosy, several births of affected children were described in spite of the strictly required use of contraception among female patients treated by it.

Vitamin A is the sole vitamin that is embryotoxic even in a therapeutic dose, for example in multivitamins, because its metabolite, retinoic acid, plays an important role as a signal molecule in the development of several tissues and organs. Its natural precursor, β-carotene, is considered safe, whereas the consumption of animal liver can lead to malformation, as the liver stores lipophilic vitamins, including retinol. Isotretinoin (13-cis-retinoic-acid; brand name Roaccutane), vitamin A analog, which is often used to treat severe acne, is such a strong teratogen that just a single dose taken by a pregnant woman (even transdermally) may result in serious birth defects. Because of this effect, most countries have systems in place to ensure that it is not given to pregnant women and that the patient is aware of how important it is to prevent pregnancy during and at least one month after treatment. Medical guidelines also suggest that pregnant women should limit vitamin A intake to about 700 μg/day, as it has teratogenic potential when consumed in excess. Vitamin A and similar substances can induce spontaneous abortions, premature births, defects of eyes (microphthalmia), ears, thymus, face deformities, and neurological (hydrocephalus, microcephalia) and cardiovascular defects, as well as intellectual disability.

Tetracycline, an antibiotic, should never be prescribed to women of reproductive age or to children, because of its negative impact on bone mineralization and teeth mineralization. The "tetracycline teeth" have brown or grey colour as a result of a defective development of both the dentine and the enamel of teeth.

Several anticonvulsants are known to be highly teratogenic. Phenytoin, also known as diphenylhydantoin, along with carbamazepine, is responsible for the fetal hydantoin syndrome, which may typically include broad nose base, cleft lip and/or palate, microcephalia, nails and fingers hypoplasia, intrauterine growth restriction, and intellectual disability. Trimethadione taken during pregnancy is responsible for the fetal trimethadione syndrome, characterized by craniofacial, cardiovascular, renal, and spine malformations, along with a delay in mental and physical development. Valproate has antifolate effects, leading to neural tube closure-related defects such as spina bifida. Lower IQ and autism have recently also been reported as a result of intrauterine valproate exposure.

Hormonal contraception is considered harmless for the embryo. Peterka and Novotná do, however, state that synthetic progestins used to prevent miscarriage in the past frequently caused masculinization of the outer reproductive organs of female newborns due to their androgenic activity. Diethylstilbestrol is a synthetic estrogen used from the 1940s to 1971, when the prenatal exposition has been linked to the clear-cell adenocarcinoma of the vagina. Following studies showed elevated risks for other tumors and congenital malformations of the sex organs for both sexes.

All cytostatics are strong teratogens; abortion is usually recommended when pregnancy is discovered during or before chemotherapy. Aminopterin, a cytostatic drug with antifolate effect, was used during the 1950s and 1960s to induce therapeutic abortions. In some cases, the abortion did not happen, but the newborns had a fetal aminopterin syndrome consisting of growth retardation, craniosynostosis, hydrocephalus, facial dismorphities, intellectual disability, or leg deformities

==== Toxic substances ====
Drinking water is often a medium through which harmful toxins travel. Heavy metals, elements, nitrates, nitrites, and fluoride can be carried through water and cause congenital disorders.

Nitrate, which is found mostly in drinking water from ground sources, is a powerful teratogen. A case-control study in rural Australia that was conducted following frequent reports of prenatal mortality and congenital malformations found that those who drank the nitrate-containing groundwater, as opposed to rain water, ran the risk of giving birth to children with central nervous system disorders, muscoskeletal defects, and cardiac defects.

Chlorinated and aromatic solvents such as benzene and trichloroethylene sometimes enter the water supply due to oversights in waste disposal. A case-control study on the area found that by 1986, leukemia was occurring in the children of Woburn, Massachusetts, at a rate that was four times the expected rate of incidence. Further investigation revealed a connection between the high occurrence of leukemia and an error in water distribution that delivered water to the town with significant contamination with manufacturing waste containing trichloroethylene. As an endocrine disruptor, DDT was shown to induce miscarriages, interfere with the development of the female reproductive system, cause congenital hypothyroidism, and increase the risk for childhood obesity.

Fluoride, when transmitted through water at high levels, can also act as a teratogen. Two reports on fluoride exposure from China, which were controlled to account for the education level of parents, found that children born to parents who were exposed to 4.12 ppm fluoride grew to have IQs that were, on average, seven points lower than their counterparts whose parents consumed water that contained 0.91 ppm fluoride. In studies conducted on rats, higher fluoride in drinking water led to increased acetylcholinesterase levels, which can alter prenatal brain development. The most significant effects were noted at a level of 5 ppm.

The fetus is even more susceptible to damage from carbon monoxide intake, which can be harmful when inhaled during pregnancy, usually through first- or second-hand tobacco smoke. The concentration of carbon monoxide in the infant born to a nonsmoking mother is around 2%, and this concentration drastically increases to a range of 6%–9% if the mother smoked tobacco. Other possible sources of prenatal carbon monoxide intoxication are exhaust gas from combustion motors, use of dichloromethane (paint thinner, varnish removers) in enclosed areas, defective gas water heaters, indoor barbeques, open flames in poorly ventilated areas, and atmospheric exposure in highly polluted areas. Exposure to carbon monoxide at toxic levels during the first two trimesters of pregnancy can lead to intrauterine growth restriction, leading to a baby who has stunted growth and is born smaller than 90% of other babies at the same gestational age. The effect of chronic exposure to carbon monoxide can depend on the stage of pregnancy in which the mother is exposed. Exposure during the embryonic stage can have neurological consequences, such as telencephalic dysgenesis, behavioral difficulties during infancy, and reduction of cerebellum volume. Also, possible skeletal defects could result from exposure to carbon monoxide during the embryonic stage, such as hand and foot malformations, hip dysplasia, hip subluxation, agenesis of a limb, and inferior maxillary atresia with glossoptosis. Also, carbon monoxide exposure between days 35 and 40 of embryonic development can lead to an increased risk of the child developing a cleft palate. Exposure to carbon monoxide or polluted ozone exposure can also lead to cardiac defects of the ventricular septal, pulmonary artery, and heart valves. The effects of carbon monoxide exposure are decreased later in fetal development during the fetal stage, but they may still lead to anoxic encephalopathy.

Industrial pollution can also lead to congenital defects. Over a period of 37 years, the Chisso Corporation, a petrochemical and plastics company, contaminated the waters of Minamata Bay with an estimated 27 tons of methylmercury, contaminating the local water supply. This led many people in the area to develop what became known as the "Minamata disease". Because methylmercury is a teratogen, the mercury poisoning of those residing by the bay resulted in neurological defects in the offspring. Infants exposed to mercury poisoning in utero showed predispositions to cerebral palsy, ataxia, inhibited psychomotor development, and intellectual disability.

Landfill sites have been shown to have adverse effects on fetal development. Extensive research has shown that landfills have several negative effects on babies born to mothers living near landfill sites: low birth weight, birth defects, spontaneous abortion, and fetal and infant mortality. Studies done around the Love Canal site near Niagara Falls and the Lipari Landfill in New Jersey have shown a higher proportion of low birth-weight babies than communities farther away from landfills. A study done in California showed a positive correlation between time and quantity of dumping and low birth weights and neonatal deaths. A study in the United Kingdom showed a correlation between pregnant women living near landfill sites and an increased risk of congenital disorders, such as neural tube defects, hypospadias, epispadia, and abdominal wall defects, such as gastroschisis and exomphalos. A study conducted on a Welsh community also showed an increased incidence of gastroschisis. Another study on 21 European hazardous-waste sites showed that those living within 3 km had an increased risk of giving birth to infants with birth defects and that as distance from the land increased, the risk decreased. These birth defects included neural tube defects, malformations of the cardiac septa, anomalies of arteries and veins, and chromosomal anomalies. Looking at communities that live near landfill sites brings up environmental justice. A vast majority of sites are located near poor, mostly black, communities. For example, between the early 1920s and 1978, about 25% of Houston's population was black. However, over 80% of landfills and incinerators during this time were located in these black communities.

Another issue regarding environmental justice is lead poisoning. A fetus exposed to lead during the pregnancy can result in learning difficulties and slowed growth. Some paints (before 1978) and pipes contain lead. Therefore, pregnant women who live in homes with lead paint inhale the dust containing lead, leading to lead exposure in the fetus. When lead pipes are used for drinking water and cooking water, this water is ingested, along with the lead, exposing the fetus to this toxin. This issue is more prevalent in poorer communities because more well-off families are able to afford to have their homes repainted and pipes renovated.

=== Endometriosis ===
Endometriosis can impact a woman's fetus, causing a 30% higher risk for congenital malformations and a 50% higher risk of neonates being under-sized for their gestational age.

=== Smoking ===
Paternal smoking prior to conception has been linked with the increased risk of congenital abnormalities in offspring.

Smoking causes DNA mutations in the germline of the father, which can be inherited by the offspring. Cigarette smoke acts as a chemical mutagen on germ cell DNA. The germ cells suffer oxidative damage, and the effects can be seen in altered mRNA production, infertility issues, and side effects in the embryonic and fetal stages of development. This oxidative damage may result in epigenetic or genetic modifications of the father's germline. Fetal lymphocytes have been damaged as a result of a father's smoking habits prior to conception.

Correlations between paternal smoking and the increased risk of offspring developing childhood cancers (including acute leukemia, brain tumors, and lymphoma) before age five have been established. Little is currently known about how paternal smoking damages the fetus, and what window of time in which the father smokes is most harmful to offspring.

=== Infections ===
A vertically transmitted infection is an infection caused by bacteria, viruses, or in rare cases, parasites transmitted directly from the mother to an embryo, fetus, or baby during pregnancy or childbirth.

Congenital disorders were initially believed to be the result of only hereditary factors. However, in the early 1940s, Australian pediatric ophthalmologist Norman Gregg began recognizing a pattern in which the infants arriving at his surgery were developing congenital cataracts at a higher rate than those who developed it from hereditary factors. On October 15, 1941, Gregg delivered a paper that explained his findings-68 out of the 78 children with congenital cataracts had been exposed in utero to rubella due to an outbreak in Australian army camps. These findings confirmed, to Gregg, that, in fact, environmental causes for congenital disorders could exist.

Rubella is known to cause abnormalities of the eye, internal ear, heart, and sometimes the teeth. More specifically, fetal exposure to rubella during weeks five to ten of development (the sixth week particularly) can cause cataracts and microphthalmia in the eyes. If the mother is infected with rubella during the ninth week, a crucial week for internal ear development, destruction of the organ of Corti can occur, causing deafness. In the heart, the ductus arteriosus can remain after birth, leading to hypertension. Rubella can also lead to atrial and ventricular septal defects in the heart. If exposed to rubella in the second trimester, the fetus can develop central nervous system malformations. However, because infections of rubella may remain undetected, misdiagnosed, or unrecognized in the mother, and/or some abnormalities are not evident until later in the child's life, precise incidence of birth defects due to rubella are not entirely known. The timing of the mother's infection during fetal development determines the risk and type of birth defect. As the embryo develops, the risk of abnormalities decreases. If exposed to the rubella virus during the first four weeks, the risk of malformations is 47%. Exposure during weeks five through eight creates a 22% chance, while weeks 9–12, a 7% chance exists, followed by 6% if the exposure is during the 13th-16th weeks. Exposure during the first eight weeks of development can also lead to premature birth and fetal death. These numbers are calculated from immediate inspection of the infant after birth. Therefore, mental defects are not accounted for in the percentages because they are not evident until later in the child's life. If they were to be included, these numbers would be much higher.

Other infectious agents include cytomegalovirus, the herpes simplex virus, hyperthermia, toxoplasmosis, and syphilis. Maternal exposure to cytomegalovirus can cause microcephaly, cerebral calcifications, blindness, chorioretinitis (which can cause blindness), hepatosplenomegaly, and meningoencephalitis in fetuses. Microcephaly is a disorder in which the fetus has an atypically small head, cerebral calcifications means certain areas of the brain have atypical calcium deposits, and meningoencephalitis is the enlargement of the brain. All three disorders cause abnormal brain function or intellectual disability. Hepatosplenomegaly is the enlargement of the liver and spleen which causes digestive problems. It can also cause some kernicterus and petechiae. Kernicterus causes yellow pigmentation of the skin, brain damage, and deafness. Petechaie is when the capillaries bleed resulting in red/purple spots on the skin. However, cytomegalovirus is often fatal in the embryo. The Zika virus can also be transmitted from the pregnant mother to her baby and cause microcephaly.

The herpes simplex virus can cause microcephaly, microphthalmus (abnormally small eyeballs), retinal dysplasia, hepatosplenomegaly, and intellectual disability. Both microphthalmus and retinal dysplasia can cause blindness. However, the most common symptom in infants is an inflammatory response that develops during the first three weeks of life. Hyperthermia causes anencephaly, which is when part of the brain and skull are absent in the infant. Mother exposure to toxoplasmosis can cause cerebral calcification, hydrocephalus (causes mental disabilities), and intellectual disability in infants. Other birth abnormalities have been reported as well, such as chorioretinitis, microphthalmus, and ocular defects. Syphilis causes congenital deafness, intellectual disability, and diffuse fibrosis in organs, such as the liver and lungs, if the embryo is exposed.

=== Malnutrition ===
For example, a lack of folic acid, a B vitamin, in the diet of a mother can cause cellular neural tube deformities that result in spina bifida. Congenital disorders such as a neural tube deformity can be prevented by 72% if the mother consumes 4 mg of folic acid before the conception and after twelve weeks of pregnancy. Folic acid, or vitamin B_{9}, aids the development of the fetal nervous system.

Studies with mice have found that food deprivation of the male mouse prior to conception leads to the offspring displaying significantly lower blood glucose levels.

=== Physical restraint ===
External physical shocks or constraints due to growth in a restricted space may result in unintended deformation or separation of cellular structures resulting in an abnormal final shape or damaged structures unable to function as expected. An example is Potter syndrome due to oligohydramnios. This finding is important for future understanding of how genetics may predispose individuals for diseases such as obesity, diabetes, and cancer.

For multicellular organisms that develop in a womb, the physical interference or presence of other similarly developing organisms such as twins can result in the two cellular masses being integrated into a larger whole, with the combined cells attempting to continue to develop in a manner that satisfies the intended growth patterns of both cell masses. The two cellular masses can compete with each other, and may either duplicate or merge various structures. This results in conditions such as conjoined twins, and the resulting merged organism may die at birth when it must leave the life-sustaining environment of the womb and must attempt to sustain its biological processes independently.

=== Genetics ===
Genetic causes of birth defects include inheritance of abnormal genes from the mother or the father, as well as new mutations in one of the germ cells that gave rise to the fetus. Male germ cells mutate at a much faster rate than female germ cells, and as the father ages, the DNA of the germ cells mutates quickly. If an egg is fertilized with sperm that has damaged DNA, a possibility exists that the fetus could develop abnormally.

Genetic disorders are all congenital (present at birth), though they may not be expressed or recognized until later in life. Genetic disorders may be grouped into single-gene defects, multiple-gene disorders, or chromosomal defects. Single-gene defects may arise from abnormalities of both copies of an autosomal gene (a recessive disorder) or of only one of the two copies (a dominant disorder). Some conditions result from deletions or abnormalities of a few genes located contiguously on a chromosome. Chromosomal disorders involve the loss or duplication of larger portions of a chromosome (or an entire chromosome) containing hundreds of genes. Large chromosomal abnormalities always produce effects on many different body parts and organ systems.

=== Defective sperm ===
Non-genetic defects in sperm cells, such as deformed centrioles and other components in the tail and neck of the sperm which are important for the embryonic development, may result in defects.

=== Socioeconomics ===
A low socioeconomic status in a deprived neighborhood may include exposure to "environmental stressors and risk factors". Socioeconomic inequalities are commonly measured by the Cartairs-Morris score, Index of Multiple Deprivation, Townsend deprivation index, and the Jarman score. The Jarman score, for example, considers "unemployment, overcrowding, single parents, under-fives, elderly living alone, ethnicity, low social class and residential mobility". In Vos' meta-analysis these indices are used to view the effect of low SES neighborhoods on maternal health. In the meta-analysis, data from individual studies were collected from 1985 up until 2008. Vos concludes that a correlation exists between prenatal adversities and deprived neighborhoods. Other studies have shown that low SES is closely associated with the development of the fetus in utero and growth retardation. Studies also suggest that children born in low SES families are "likely to be born prematurely, at low birth weight, or with asphyxia, a birth defect, a disability, fetal alcohol syndrome, or AIDS". Bradley and Corwyn also suggest that congenital disorders arise from the mother's lack of nutrition, a poor lifestyle, maternal substance abuse and "living in a neighborhood that contains hazards affecting fetal development (toxic waste dumps)". In a meta-analysis that viewed how inequalities influenced maternal health, it was suggested that deprived neighborhoods often promoted behaviors such as smoking, drug and alcohol use. After controlling for socioeconomic factors and ethnicity, several individual studies demonstrated an association with outcomes such as perinatal mortality and preterm birth.

=== Radiation ===
For the survivors of the atomic bombing of Hiroshima and Nagasaki, who are known as the Hibakusha, no statistically demonstrable increase of birth defects/congenital malformations was found among their later conceived children, or found in the later conceived children of cancer survivors who had previously received radiotherapy. The surviving women of Hiroshima and Nagasaki who were able to conceive, though exposed to substantial amounts of radiation, later had children with no higher incidence of abnormalities/birth defects than in the Japanese population as a whole.

Relatively few studies have researched the effects of paternal radiation exposure on offspring. Following the Chernobyl disaster, it was assumed in the 1990s that the germ line of irradiated fathers suffered minisatellite mutations in the DNA, which was inherited by descendants. More recently, however, the World Health Organization states, "children conceived before or after their father's exposure showed no statistically significant differences in mutation frequencies". This statistically insignificant increase was also seen by independent researchers analyzing the children of the liquidators. Animal studies have shown that incomparably massive doses of X-ray irradiation of male mice resulted in birth defects of the offspring.

In the 1980s, a relatively high prevalence of pediatric leukemia cases in children living near a nuclear processing plant in West Cumbria, UK, led researchers to investigate whether the cancer was a result of paternal radiation exposure. A significant association between paternal irradiation and offspring cancer was found, but further research areas close to other nuclear processing plants did not produce the same results. Later this was determined to be the Seascale cluster in which the leading hypothesis is the influx of foreign workers, who have a different rate of leukemia within their race than the British average, resulted in the observed cluster of 6 children more than expected around Cumbria.

=== Parent's age ===
Certain birth complications can occur more often in advanced maternal age (greater than 35 years). Complications include fetal growth restriction, preeclampsia, placental abruption, pre-mature births, and stillbirth. These complications not only may put the child at risk, but also the mother.

The effects of the father's age on offspring are not yet well understood and are studied far less extensively than the effects of the mother's age. Fathers contribute proportionally more DNA mutations to their offspring via their germ cells than the mother, with the paternal age governing how many mutations are passed on. This is because, as humans age, male germ cells acquire mutations at a much faster rate than female germ cells.

Around a 5% increase in the incidence of ventricular septal defects, atrial septal defects, and patent ductus arteriosus in offspring has been found to be correlated with advanced paternal age. Advanced paternal age has also been linked to increased risk of achondroplasia and Apert syndrome. Offspring born to fathers under the age of 20 show increased risk of being affected by patent ductus arteriosus, ventricular septal defects, and the tetralogy of Fallot. It is hypothesized that this may be due to environmental exposures or lifestyle choices.

Research has found that there is a correlation between advanced paternal age and risk of birth defects such as limb anomalies, syndromes involving multiple systems, and Down syndrome. Recent studies have concluded that 5–9% of Down syndrome cases are due to paternal effects, but these findings are controversial.

There is concrete evidence that advanced paternal age is associated with the increased likelihood that a mother will have a miscarriage or that fetal death will occur.

=== Unknown ===
Although significant progress has been made in identifying the etiology of some birth defects, approximately 65% have no known or identifiable cause. These are referred to as sporadic, a term that implies an unknown cause, random occurrence regardless of maternal living conditions, and a low recurrence risk for future children. For 20–25% of anomalies there seems to be a "multifactorial" cause, meaning a complex interaction of multiple minor genetic anomalies with environmental risk factors. Another 10–13% of anomalies have a purely environmental cause (e.g. infections, illness, or drug abuse in the mother). Only 12–25% of anomalies have a purely genetic cause. Of these, the majority are chromosomal anomalies.

Congenital disorders are not limited to humans and can be found in a variety of other species, including cattle. One such condition is called schistosomus reflexus and is defined by spinal inversion, exposure of abdominal viscera, and limb abnormalities.

== Prevention ==
Folate supplements decrease the risk of neural tube defects. Tentative evidence supports the role of L-arginine in decreasing the risk of intrauterine growth restriction.

== Screening ==
Newborn screening tests were introduced in the early 1960s and initially dealt with just two disorders. Since then tandem mass spectrometry, gas chromatography–mass spectrometry, and DNA analysis has made it possible for a much larger range of disorders to be screened. Newborn screening mostly measures metabolite and enzyme activity using a dried blood spot sample. Screening tests are carried out in order to detect serious disorders that may be treatable to some extent. Early diagnosis makes possible the readiness of therapeutic dietary information, enzyme replacement therapy and organ transplants. Different countries support the screening for a number of metabolic disorders (inborn errors of metabolism (IEM)), and genetic disorders including cystic fibrosis and Duchenne muscular dystrophy. Tandem mass spectroscopy can also be used for IEM, and investigation of sudden infant death, and shaken baby syndrome.

Screening can also be carried out prenatally and can include obstetric ultrasonography to give scans such as the nuchal scan. 3D ultrasound scans can give detailed information of structural anomalies.

== Epidemiology ==
Congenital birth defect mortality rates in children under 5

Congenital anomalies resulted in about 632,000 deaths per year in 2013 down from 751,000 in 1990. The types with the greatest death are congenital heart defects (323,000), followed by neural tube defects (69,000).

Many studies have found that the frequency of occurrence of certain congenital malformations depends on the sex of the child (table). For example, pyloric stenosis occurs more often in males while congenital hip dislocation is four to five times more likely to occur in females. Among children with one kidney, there are approximately twice as many males, whereas among children with three kidneys there are approximately 2.5 times more females. The same pattern is observed among infants with excessive number of ribs, vertebrae, teeth and other organs which in a process of evolution have undergone reduction—among them there are more females. Contrarily, among the infants with their scarcity, there are more males. Anencephaly is shown to occur approximately twice as frequently in females. The number of boys born with 6 fingers is two times higher than the number of girls. Now various techniques are available to detect congenital anomalies in fetus before birth.

About 3% of newborns have a "major physical anomaly", meaning a physical anomaly that has cosmetic or functional significance. Physical congenital abnormalities are the leading cause of infant mortality in the United States, accounting for more than 20% of all infant deaths. Seven to ten percent of all children will require extensive medical care to diagnose or treat a birth defect.

The sex ratio of patients with congenital malformations
Congenital anomaly	Sex ratio, ♂♂:♀♀
Defects with female predominance	
Congenital hip dislocation	1 : 5.2; 1 : 5; 1 : 8; 1 : 3.7
Cleft palate	1 : 3
Anencephaly	1 : 1.9; 1 : 2
Craniocele	1 : 1.8
Aplasia of lung	1 : 1.51
Spinal herniation	1 : 1.4
Diverticulum of the esophagus	1 : 1.4
Stomach	1 : 1.4
Neutral defects	
Hypoplasia of the tibia and femur	1 : 1.2
Spina bifida	1 : 1.2
Atresia of small intestine	1 : 1
Microcephaly	1.2 : 1
Esophageal atresia	1.3 : 1; 1.5 : 1
Hydrocephalus	1.3 : 1
Defects with male predominance	
Diverticula of the colon	1.5 : 1
Atresia of the rectum	1.5 : 1; 2 : 1
Unilateral renal agenesis	2 : 1; 2.1 : 1
Schistocystis	2 : 1
Cleft lip and palate	2 : 1; 1.47 : 1
Bilateral renal agenesis	2.6 : 1
Congenital anomalies of the genitourinary system	2.7 : 1
Pyloric stenosis, congenital	5 : 1; 5.4 : 1
Meckel's diverticulum	More common in boys
Congenital megacolon	More common in boys
All defects	1.22 : 1; 1.29 : 1

- Data obtained on opposite-sex twins. ** — Data were obtained in the period 1983–1994.

P. M. Rajewski and A. L. Sherman (1976) have analyzed the frequency of congenital anomalies in relation to the system of the organism. Prevalence of men was recorded for the anomalies of phylogenetically younger organs and systems.

In respect of an etiology, sexual distinctions can be divided on appearing before and after differentiation of male's gonads during embryonic development, which begins from the eighteenth week. The testosterone level in male embryos thus raises considerably. The subsequent hormonal and physiological distinctions of male and female embryos can explain some sexual differences in frequency of congenital defects. It is difficult to explain the observed differences in the frequency of birth defects between the sexes by the details of the reproductive functions or the influence of environmental and social factors.

=== United States ===
The CDC and National Birth Defect Project studied the incidence of birth defects in the US. Key findings include:

- Down syndrome was the most common condition with an estimated prevalence of 14.47 per 10,000 live births, implying about 6,000 diagnoses each year.
- About 7,000 babies are born with a cleft palate, cleft lip or both.

Adjusted National Prevalence Estimates and Estimated Number of Cases in the United States, 2004–2006
Birth Defects	Cases per Births	Estimated Annual Number of Cases	Estimated National Prevalence per 10,000 Live Births (Adjusted for maternal race/ethnicity)
Central nervous system defects
Anencephaly	1 in 4,859	859	2.06
Spina bifida without anencephaly	1 in 2,858	1460	3.50
Encephalocele	1 in 12,235	341	0.82
Eye defects
Anophthalmia/ microphthalmia	1 in 5,349	780	1.87
Cardiovascular defects
Common truncus	1 in 13,876	301	0.72
Transposition of great arteries	1 in 3,333	1252	3.00
Tetralogy of Fallot	1 in 2,518	1657	3.97
Atrioventricular septal defect	1 in 2,122	1966	4.71
Hypoplastic left heart syndrome	1 in 4,344	960	2.30
Orofacial defects
Cleft palate without cleft lip	1 in 1,574	2651	6.35
Cleft lip with and without cleft palate	1 in 940	4437	10.63
Gastrointestinal defects
Esophageal atresia/tracheoeophageal fistula	1 in 4,608	905	2.17
Rectal and large intestinalatresia/stenosis	1 in 2,138	1952	4.68
Musculoskeletal defects
Clubfoot, lower limbs	1 in 250 ~ 1000	...	...
Reduction deformity, upper limbs	1 in 2,869	1454	3.49
Reduction deformity, lower limbs	1 in 5,949	701	1.68
Gastroschisis	1 in 2,229	1871	4.49
Omphalocele	1 in 5,386	775	1.86
Diaphragmatic hernia	1 in 3,836	1088	2.61
Chromosomal anomalies
Trisomy 13	1 in 7,906	528	1.26
Trisomy 21 (Down syndrome)	1 in 691	6037	14.47
Trisomy 18	1 in 3,762	1109	2.66

== See also ==
- Idiopathic
- List of congenital disorders
- List of ICD-9 codes 740-759: Congenital anomalies
- Malformative syndrome
- March of Dimes
- Mitochondrial disease
- National Birth Defects Prevention Network, founded 1997
- Supernumerary body part
