= Leuch =

Leuch is a surname. Notable people with the surname include:

- Éric le Leuch (born 1971), French sprint canoer
- Morten Leuch (1732-1768), Norwegian timber trader and landowner
- Peter F. Leuch (1883-1959), American lawyer and politician

== See also ==
- Annie Leuch-Reineck (1880-1978), Swiss mathematician and women's rights activist
- Leuchs, a surname
