= Fetal trimethadione syndrome =

- Other names: German syndrome
- Condition is caused by Trimethadione (and paramethadione)

Fetal trimethadione syndrome (also known as paramethadione syndrome, German syndrome, tridione syndrome, among others) is a set of birth defects caused by the administration of either of the anticonvulsants trimethadione (also known as Tridione) and paramethadione to epileptic mothers during pregnancy.

Fetal trimethadione syndrome is classified as a rare disease by the National Institute of Health's Office of Rare Diseases, meaning it affects less than 200,000 individuals in the United States.

The fetal loss rate while using trimethadione has been reported to be as high as 87%.

== Presentation ==
Fetal trimethadione syndrome is characterized by the following major symptoms as a result of the teratogenic characteristics of trimethadione.

- Cranial and facial abnormalities which include; microcephaly, midfacial flattening, V-shaped eyebrows and a short nose
- Cardiovascular abnormalities
- Absent kidney and ureter
- Meningocele, a birth defect of the spine
- Omphalocele, a birth defect where portions of the abdominal contents project into the umbilical cord
- A delay in mental and physical development

== Treatment ==
Surgery may help alleviate the effects of some physical defects, but prognosis is poor, especially for those with severe cardiovascular and cognitive problems. Speech and physical therapy, as well as special education, is required for surviving children.
