= National Birth Defects Prevention Network =

The National Birth Defects Prevention Network (NBDPN) was founded in 1997. It is a 501(c)3 not-for-profit volunteer organization whose members are involved in birth defects surveillance, prevention and research. It was created with help from the Centers for Disease Control and Prevention to establish and maintain a national network of state and population-based programs for birth defects surveillance and research. The NBDPN is committed to the primary prevention of birth defects and improvement of outcomes for children and families living with birth defects through the use of birth defects surveillance data for research, program planning, and program evaluation. NBDPN members include public health officials, epidemiologists, academics and parents.

== Annual meeting ==
In early spring (late February or early March) of each year, NBDPN's members, partners and international colleagues gather together at NBDPN's annual meeting. Featured presentations and a variety of breakout sessions are scheduled to appeal to a diverse audience and cover birth defects surveillance, research, and prevention issues. Also on the annual meeting agenda are sessions designed to encourage information sharing and networking, such as poster presentations and exhibits.

== Annual Report ==
The NBDPN publishes its annual report in December Issue of the Journal of Birth Defects Research Part A (BDRA). The annual report has two parts: 1) a series of articles relating to various issues in surveillance, epidemiology, and the application of surveillance data to birth defects prevention and public health programs, and 2) statistical data from population-based surveillance programs across the United States. Previous reports were published as Teratology in 1997 and 2000–2002 and in BDRA since 2003. Additionally, the Spring issue of the Journal of Registry Management publishes articles on birth defects surveillance from NBDPN members and others on an annual basis.

== Collaborative Projects ==
The NBDPN helps facilitate collaborative projects that utilize data from state birth defects registries. Publications from some of these projects have been cited many times in the literature and during presentations. The list of publications resulting from the collaborative projects conducted by the NBDPN members can be found at NBDPN's website.
