= Malformative syndrome =

A malformative syndrome (or malformation syndrome) is a recognizable pattern of congenital anomalies that are known or thought to be causally related (VIIth International Congress on Human Genetics).

== Causes ==
- exogenous causes
  - exogenous toxic (teratogenetic agents)
  - ionizing radiations
  - fetal infections (maternofetal infections)
- genetic causes (or intrinsic causes) (genetic malformative diseases)
  - chromosomal anomalies (chromosomal malformative diseases)
  - numerical chromosomal anomalies (e.g. trisomy 13, trisomy 18, trisomy 21)
  - structural chromosomal anomalies
    - microdeletions (microdeletion syndromes)
    - chromosomal rearrangements
- gene mutations (monogenic malformative diseases)
  - Kabuki mask syndrome: MLL2
  - Joubert syndrome, Meckel syndrome and related syndromes: TMEM216
  - cleft lip with and without cleft palate: MAFB and ABCA4
  - Schinzel–Giedion syndrome: SETBP1
  - Fanconi anemia and related disorders: RAD51C
  - Noonan syndrome: NRAS
  - generalized lymph vessel dysplasia: CCBE1
  - brachydactyly-anonychia: SOX9
  - genetic metabolic diseases
    - Smith–Lemli–Opitz syndrome

== See also ==
- Congenital abnormality
- List of congenital disorders
- List of ICD-9 codes 740-759: Congenital anomalies
- March of Dimes
