= Lipari Landfill =

Coordinates: 39.72851°N 75.14221°W

The Lipari Landill is an inactive landfill on a 6-acre (2.4 ha) former gravel pit in Mantua Township, New Jersey. It was used from 1958 to 1971 as a dump site for household and industrial wastes. Toxic organic compounds and heavy metals dumped at the site have percolated into the ground water and leached into lakes and streams in the surrounding area. The site has been identified as the worst toxic dump in the United States and was ranked at the top of the United States Environmental Protection Agency's Superfund eligibility list.

== History ==
Nicholas Lipari had operated a sand and gravel pit at the site. During the period from 1958 until 1971, the landfill accepted 46,000 barrels of chemicals, containing approximately 2.7 million US gallons (10,000 m^{3}) of industrial waste, that were placed in trenches that had been excavated in the gravel pit. 12 thousand tons of solid industrial waste were also dumped at the site. The New Jersey Solid Waste Authority had the site shut down in 1971.

The toxic materials came from several different companies, with Philadelphia-based Rohm and Haas accounting for most of the material. Toxic material dumped at the site also came from an Owens-Illinois plant in Glassboro and a CBS Records plant in Pitman. More than 150 different chemicals, including BCEE (Bis-2-Chloroethyl ether), benzene, 1,2 Dichloroethylene, arsenic, lead and mercury have been identified at the site. In September 1985, the EPA filed lawsuits against seven companies, including Rohm & Haas, to recover the costs of the remediation at the site.

Approximately 100,000 US gallons (380,000 L) of contaminated water had been leaking from the site on a daily basis, leaching into groundwater or washed away in the rain. In 1983, following the construction of a 30-inch-thick (760 mm) wall constructed around the center of the dump site, seepage was reduced to 2,500 US gallons (9,500 L) per day. The contaminated areas at the dump site were also covered with a high-density polyethylene (HDPE) cap. In 1992 a treatment plant was constructed to flush the landfill. By 1996 off-site work including excavation of the marsh, portions of the stream bed, and the lake sediment excavation was completed. Drains to capture contaminated water from outside and below the landfill were completed which must be operated indefinitely. These drains have successfully protected the surrounding environment from landfill contaminants and are constantly monitored to insure their effectiveness. Today, remediation continues at the Landfill through the removal of vast quantities of volatile organic compounds, such as benzene and toluene. These compounds are removed in the vapor phase and destroyed. To date (2010) over 500,000 pounds (230,000 kg) of contaminants have been removed from Lipari.

== Effects ==
In the mid-1980s, the Borough of Pitman closed a playground at Betty Park, an area adjoining Alcyon Lake, as the levels of hazardous chemicals present in the soil were higher than safety levels established at the Federal level.

A study performed by the New Jersey Department of Health in 1989 showed that those living within one kilometer of the dump site were at greater risk of adult leukemia and of giving birth to low birth weight babies than those living further away.

A follow-up study by medical investigators released in 1997 reviewing details of 9,000 children born to parents living near the dump site found clear evidence of a link to the toxic chemicals and a significant drop in birth weight and a risk of pre-term delivery that was twice as high as normal. The increased effects peaked for those children born between 1971 and 1975, a period when the contaminants leaking from the site were at their peak. The study also found that after the dump was closed and cleanup began, birth weights increased until they were higher than those from surrounding areas in the most recent data. The peer-reviewed studies were included in Environmental Health Perspectives, a monthly journal published by the National Institute of Environmental Health Sciences.

== Remediation ==
In March 1994, Rohm and Haas reached a settlement with the United States Department of Justice under which the firm would address its liability for the materials it dumped there by spending an estimated $50 million to clean up the landfill site.

The cleanup project was estimated to have run in excess of $100 million by 1995, with the majority of costs paid by the companies that had material dumped at the site. Barrels for which manufacturers paid about 75 cents each as a fee to the landfill owner ended up costing around $2,000 per barrel to remove the contaminants from the soil.

About 90,000 tons of contaminated soil was removed from the off-site areas temporarily stored at the site of a former stock car race track in Pitman and later sent to a properly lined landfill. In 1995, Pitman's Alcyon Lake was drained and the sediment at the lake's bottom was removed for storage at the race track and later shipped offsite. Over a fifteen-year period, millions of gallons of water were pumped into the landfill to carry the toxic material through a system of pipes and into a pre-treatment facility that would treat the chemicals carried off in the leachate. Effluent from the plant was then sent to the local utility authority.
