= 2,4-Oxazolidinedione =

2,4-Oxazolidenedione

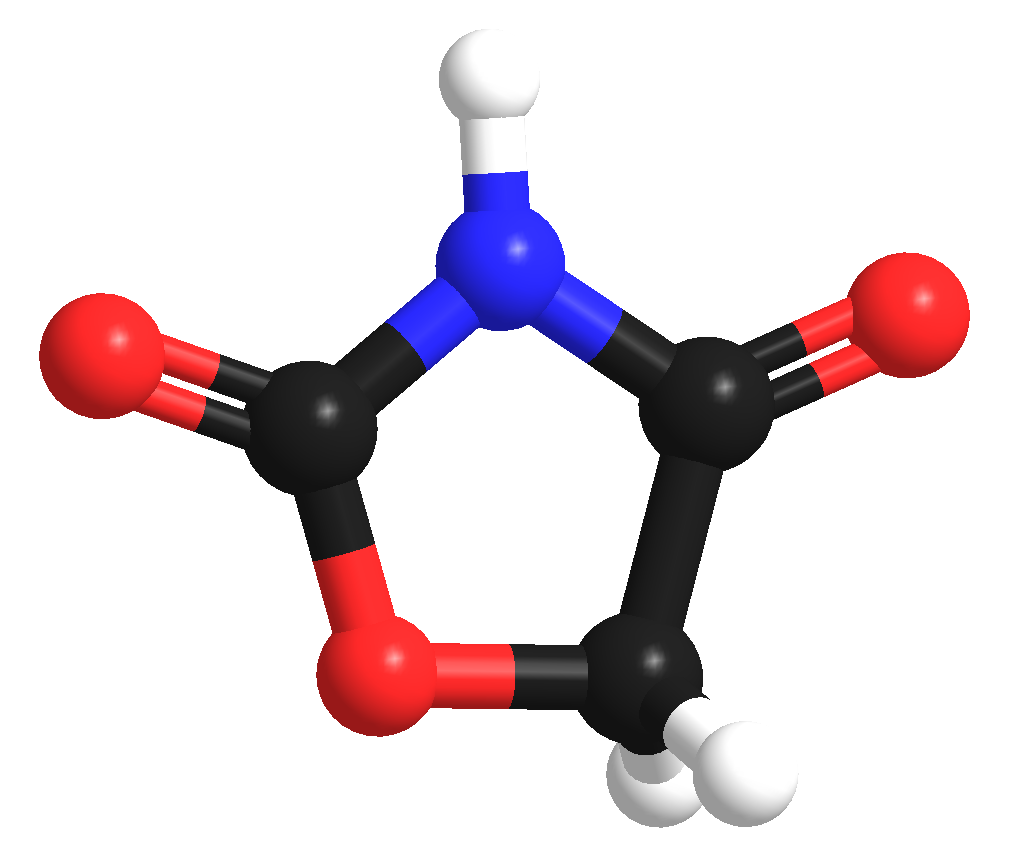

Names
- Preferred IUPAC name 1,3-Oxazolidine-2,4-dione
- Other names 2,4-Oxazolidenedione

Identifiers
CAS Number	2346-26-1
3D model (JSmol)	Interactive image
ChemSpider	87905
PubChem CID	97389
UNII	R22D15229R
CompTox Dashboard (EPA)	DTXSID60894083
- InChI: InChI=1S/C3H3NO3/c5-2-1-7-3(6)4-2/h1H2,(H,4,5,6) Key: COWNFYYYZFRNOY-UHFFFAOYSA-N; InChI=1S/C3H3NO3/c5-2-1-7-3(6)4-2/h1H2,(H,4,5,6); Key: COWNFYYYZFRNOY-UHFFFAOYSA-N
- SMILES: O=C1NC(=O)OC1

Properties
Chemical formula	C_{3}H_{3}NO_{3}
Molar mass	101.061 g·mol^{−1}
Appearance	white solid
Melting point	89–90 °C (192–194 °F; 362–363 K)
- Except where otherwise noted, data are given for materials in their standard state (at 25 °C [77 °F], 100 kPa). verify (what is ?) Infobox references

2,4-Oxazolidinedione is an organic compound with the formula HN(CO)_{2}OCH_{2}. It is a white solid. It is the parent structure for a variety anticonvulsant drugs. The parent compound itself is obtained by treating chloroacetamide with bicarbonate.

Dimethadione

Ethadione

Paramethadione

Trimethadione

== See also ==
- Glycine N-carboxyanhydride (2,5-oxazolidinedione), the isomeric ring
