= Glycine N-carboxyanhydride =

Names
- Preferred IUPAC name 1,3-Oxazolidine-2,5-dione
- Other names glycine N-carboxyanhydride

Identifiers
CAS Number	2185-00-4
3D model (JSmol)	Interactive image
ChemSpider	67684
ECHA InfoCard	100.016.882
EC Number	218-570-6
PubChem CID	75136
UNII	9V6987Y758
CompTox Dashboard (EPA)	DTXSID80176257
- InChI: InChI=1S/C3H3NO3/c5-2-1-4-3(6)7-2/h1H2,(H,4,6) Key: ARAFEULRMHFMDE-UHFFFAOYSA-N
- SMILES: C1C(=O)OC(=O)N1

Properties
Chemical formula	C_{3}H_{3}NO_{3}
Molar mass	101.061 g·mol^{−1}
Appearance	white solid
Density	1.74 g/cm^{3}
Melting point	96–98 °C (205–208 °F; 369–371 K)

Hazards
- GHS labelling
Pictograms	(GHS05: Corrosive) (GHS07: Exclamation mark)
Signal word	Danger
Hazard statements	H315, H318, H335
Precautionary statements	P261, P264, P264+P265, P271, P280, P302+P352, P304+P340, P305+P354+P338, P317, P319, P321, P332+P317, P362+P364, P403+P233, P405, P501
- Except where otherwise noted, data are given for materials in their standard state (at 25 °C [77 °F], 100 kPa). Infobox references

Glycine N-carboxyanhydride is an organic compound with the formula HNCH(CO)_{2}O. A colorless solid, it is the product of phosgenation (reaction with phosgene) of glycine. Glycine N-carboxyanhydride is the simplest member of the amino acid N-carboxyanhydrides. It is also the parent of the 2,5-oxazolidinedione family of heterocycles.

== Other derivatives ==
2,5-Oxazolidinediones can also be prepared from Schiff base derivatives of amino acids.

== See also ==
- 2,4-Oxazolidinedione, the isomeric parent ring found in a variety anticonvulsant drugs
