= Amino acid N-carboxyanhydride =

Class of organic compounds

- N-Carboxyanhydrides
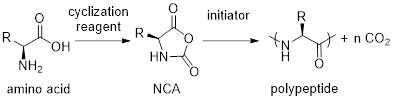
- Formation and polymerization of an NCA.

Amino acid N-carboxyanhydrides, also called Leuchs' anhydrides, are a family of heterocyclic organic compounds derived from amino acids. They are white, moisture-reactive solids. They have been evaluated for applications the field of biomaterials.

== Preparation ==
Glycine N-carboxyanhydride is the parent member of the amino acid N-carboxyanhydrides.

NCAs are typically prepared by phosgenation of amino acids:

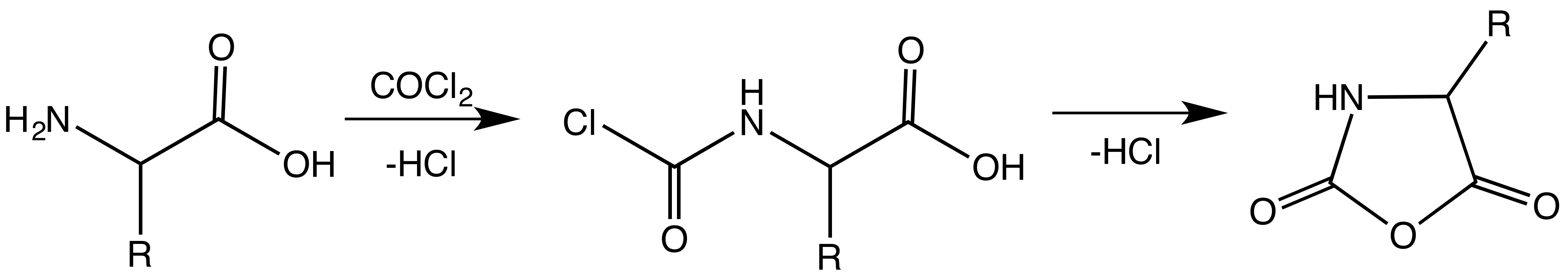

They were first synthesized by Hermann Leuchs by heating an N-ethoxycarbonyl or N-methoxycarbonyl amino acid chloride in a vacuum at 50-70 °C:

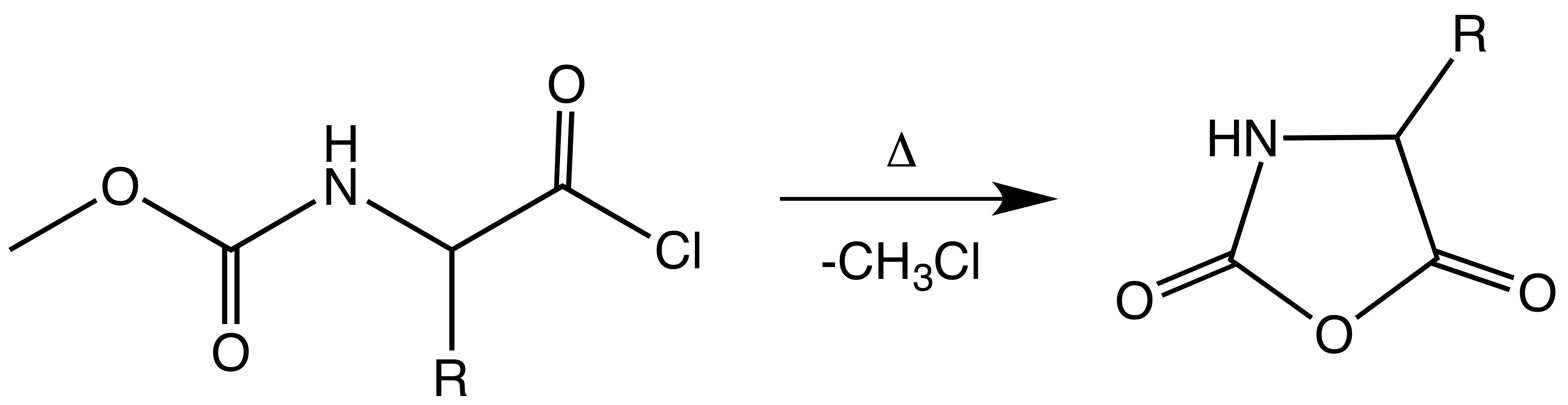

A moisture-tolerant route to unprotected NCAs employs epoxides as scavengers of hydrogen chloride.

This synthesis of NCAs is sometimes called the Leuchs method. The relatively high temperatures necessary for this cyclization results in the decomposition of several NCAs. Of several improvements, one notable procedure involves treating an unprotected amino acid with phosgene or its trimer.

== Reactions ==
NCAs are prone to hydrolysis to the parent amino acid:

RCHNHC(O)OC(O) + H_{2}O → H_{2}NCH(R)CO_{2}H + CO_{2}

Some derivatives however tolerate water briefly.

NCAs convert to homopolypeptides ( [N(H)CH(R)CO)]_{n}) through ring-opening polymerization:

n RCHNHC(O)OC(O) → [N(H)CH(R)CO)]_{n} + n CO_{2}

Poly-L-lysine has been prepared from N-carbobenzyloxy-α-N-carboxy-L-lysine anhydride, followed by deprotection with phosphonium iodide. Peptide synthesis from NCAs does not require protection of the amino acid functional groups. N-Substituted NCAs, such as sulfenamide derivatives have also been examined. The ring-opening polymerization of NCAs is catalyzed by metal catalysts.

The polymerization of NCA’s have been considered as a prebiotic route to polypeptides.

NCAs can also be used to form amides and lactams by reaction of carboxylic acids and isocyanates.

== See also ==
- Dakin–West reaction
- Glycine N-carboxyanhydride, the parent NCA
