= Hermann Leuchs =

German chemist (1879–1945)

Friedrich Hermann Leuchs
- Born: 26 August 1879; Nürnberg, German Empire
- Died: 2 May 1945 (aged 65); Berlin, Nazi Germany
- Education: Friedrich Wilhelm University of Berlin
- Scientific career
- Fields: Organic chemistry
- Doctoral advisor: Emil Fischer

Friedrich Hermann Leuchs (8 August 1879 – 2 May 1945) was a German chemist.

== Life ==
Leuchs studied chemistry at the Ludwig-Maximilians-Universität München from 1898. He transferred to the Friedrich Wilhelm University of Berlin and received his PhD there in 1902 under Emil Fischer. He steadily advanced in the hierarchy of the university, becoming a lecturer in 1910, assistant professor in 1914, and full professor in 1916. The ministry of education assured him that he would succeed Wilhelm Schlenk as head of the chemistry institute of the Friedrich Wilhelm University of Berlin, but this never happened. His personality became strongly misanthropic. The Nazi regime, World War II and the destruction of Berlin increased his psychological problems, and shortly before the war ended he committed suicide in his flat in Berlin. This happened most likely on 2 May 1945 (two days after the suicide of Adolf Hitler). He was buried in a mass grave with numerous soldiers and citizens.

== Work ==
Leuchs's research dealt with the chemistry of amino acids and the chemistry of strychnine. The Leuchs reaction and the Leuchs anhydride were named after him.
