= Trimethadione =

Anticonvulsant

Clinical data
- Trade names: Tridione
- AHFS/Drugs.com: Micromedex Detailed Consumer Information
- Pregnancy category: X
- Routes of administration: By mouth
- ATC code: N03AC02 (WHO)

Legal status
- Legal status: In general: ℞ (Prescription only)

Pharmacokinetic data
- Bioavailability: High
- Metabolism: Demethylated to dimethadione
- Elimination half-life: 12–24 hours (trimethadione); 6–13 days (dimethadione)
- Excretion: Renal

Identifiers
- IUPAC name: 3,5,5-Trimethyl-1,3-oxazolidine-2,4-dione
- CAS Number: 127-48-0
- PubChem CID: 5576
- IUPHAR/BPS: 7316
- DrugBank: DB00347
- ChemSpider: 5374
- UNII: R7GV3H6FQ4
- KEGG: D00392
- ChEBI: CHEBI:9727
- ChEMBL: ChEMBL695
- CompTox Dashboard (EPA): DTXSID9021396
- ECHA InfoCard: 100.004.406

Chemical and physical data
- Formula: C_{6}H_{9}NO_{3}
- Molar mass: 143.142 g·mol^{−1}
- 3D model (JSmol): Interactive image
- SMILES: O=C1N(C(=O)OC1(C)C)C
- InChI: InChI=1S/C6H9NO3/c1-6(2)4(8)7(3)5(9)10-6/h1-3H3; Key:IRYJRGCIQBGHIV-UHFFFAOYSA-N

Trimethadione (Tridione) is an oxazolidinedione anticonvulsant. It is most commonly used to treat epileptic conditions that are resistant to other treatments.

It is primarily effective in treating absence seizures, but can also be used in refractory temporal lobe epilepsy. It is usually administered 3 or 4 times daily, with the total daily dose ranging from 900 mg to 2.4 g. Treatment is most effective when the concentration of its active metabolite, dimethadione, is above 700 μg/mL. Severe adverse reactions are possible, including Steven Johnson syndrome, nephrotoxicity, hepatitis, aplastic anemia, neutropenia, or agranulocytosis. More common adverse effects include drowsiness, hemeralopia, and hiccups.

== Fetal trimethadione syndrome ==
If administered during pregnancy, fetal trimethadione syndrome may result causing facial dysmorphism (short upturned nose, slanted eyebrows), cardiac defects, intrauterine growth restriction (IUGR), and intellectual disability. The fetal loss rate while using trimethadione has been reported to be as high as 87%.
