= List of Superfund sites in New Jersey =

The following is a list of Superfund sites in New Jersey designated as such under the Comprehensive Environmental Response, Compensation, and Liability Act (CERCLA).

== Background ==
For decades, it was standard practice to dump waste on the ground, in rivers or to leave it out in the open. As a result, thousands of uncontrolled or abandoned contaminated sites were created. Some common contaminated sites include abandoned warehouses, manufacturing facilities, processing plants and landfills. In response to growing concern over health and environmental risks posed by these contaminated sites, the 96th Congress established the Superfund program in 1980 to clean up these sites.

The Superfund program is administered by the U.S. Environmental Protection Agency (EPA) in cooperation with individual states. In New Jersey, the Department of Environmental Protection's (NJDEP) Site Remediation Program oversees the Superfund program.

As of 16 August 2024, there are 115 Superfund sites listed on the National Priorities List (NPL). Thirty-six additional sites have been cleaned up and deleted from the list.

== National Priorities List ==
Sites currently listed on the NPL:

Site Name	Municipality	County	Listed	Map	CERCLIS ID	Latitude	Longitude
American Cyanamid	Bridgewater Township	Somerset	09/08/1983	Link	NJD002173276	40.555560	-74.559450
A.O. Polymer Corporation	Sparta Township	Sussex	09/08/1983	Link	NJD030253355	41.043563	-74.628153
Asbestos Dump	Long Hill & Harding Township	Morris	09/08/1983	Link	NJD980654149	40.672009	-74.525725
Atlantic Resources Corporation	Sayreville Borough	Middlesex	09/05/2002	Link	NJD981558430	40.48611	-74.31944
Bog Creek Farm	Howell Township	Monmouth	09/08/1983	Link	NJD063157150	39.389839	-74.524042
Brick Township Landfill	Brick Township	Ocean	09/08/1983	Link	NJD980505176	40.1098	-74.1311
Bridgeport Rental & Oil Services, Inc. (BROS)	Logan Township	Gloucester	09/08/1983	Link	NJD053292652	39.804636	-75.322563
Brook Industrial Park	Bound Brook	Somerset	10/04/1989	Link	NJD078251675	40.560003	-74.536694
Burnt Fly Bog	Marlboro Township	Monmouth	09/08/1983	Link	NJD980504997	40.375	-74.27916
Caldwell Trucking Company	Fairfield Township	Essex	09/08/1983	Link	NJD048798953	40.87638	-74.27138
Chemical Control Corporation	Elizabeth City	Union	09/21/1984	Link	NJD000607481	40.636140	-74.201385
Chemical Insecticide Corporation	Edison Township	Middlesex	08/30/1990	Link	NJD980484653	40.1098	-74.1311
Chemical Leaman Tank Lines, Inc.	Logan Township	Gloucester	09/21/1984	Link	NJD047321443	39.810221	-75.314678
Chemsol, Inc.	Piscataway Township	Middlesex	09/08/1983	Link	NJD980528889	40.562267	-74.444184
Ciba-Geigy Corporation	Toms River	Ocean	09/08/1983	Link	NJD001502517	39.966380	-74.215196
Cinnaminson Ground Water Contamination	Cinnaminson Township	Burlington	06/10/1986	Link	NJD980785638	40.015887	-74.989821
Combe Fill South Landfill	Chester Township & Washington Township	Morris	09/08/1983	Link	NJD980530596	40.769838	-74.732571
Cornell Dubilier Electronics, Inc.	South Plainfield	Middlesex	7/22/1998	Link	NJD981557879	40.576429	-74.412280
Cosden Chemical Coating Corporation	Beverly City	Burlington	07/22/1987	Link	NJD000565531	40.05818	-74.92589
CPS/Madison Industries	Old Bridge Township	Middlesex	09/08/1983	Link	NJD002141190	40.434029	-74.327279
Crown Vantage Landfill	Alexandria Township	Hunterdon	09/10/2013	Link	NJN000204492	40.527465	-75.064608
Curcio Scrap Metal, Inc.	Saddle Brook Township	Bergen	07/22/1987	Link	NJD011717584	40.891062	-74.103310
D'Imperio Property	Hamilton Township	Atlantic	09/08/1983	Link	NJD980529416	39.45443	-74.65888
DeRewal Chemical Company	Kingwood Township	Hunterdon	09/21/1984	Link	NJD980761373	40.485333	-75.060065
Diamond Alkali Company/Diamond Shamrock	Newark City	Essex	09/08/1983	Link	NJD980528996	40.738988	-74.136103
Diamond Head Oil Refinery	Kearny Town	Hudson	09/05/2002	Link	NJD092226000	40.749674	-74.135447
Dover Municipal Well #4	Dover Town	Morris	09/08/1983	Link	NJD980654131	40.887787	-74.543547
Ellis Property	Evesham Township	Burlington	09/08/1983	Link	NJD980529085	39.913553	-74.865916
Emmells Septic Landfill	Galloway Township	Atlantic	07/22/1993	Link	NJD980772727	39.50069	-74.54361
Evor-Phillips Leasing Company	Old Bridge Township	Middlesex	09/08/1983	Link	NJD980654222	40.427627	-74.336869
Ewan Property	Shamong Township	Burlington	09/21/1984	Link	NJD980761365	39.813942	-74.720211
FAA Technical Center	Egg Harbor & Galloway Township	Atlantic	08/30/1990	Link	NJ9690510020	39.469946	-74.595824
Fair Lawn Well Fields	Fair Lawn Borough	Bergen	09/08/1983	Link	NJD980654107	40.944018	-74.133230
Federal Creosote Company	Manville Borough	Somerset	09/08/1983	Link	NJ0001900281	40.544214	-74.584317
Franklin Burn	Franklin Township	Gloucester	06/17/1996	Link	NJD986570992	39.605869	-75.004724
Fried Industries, Inc.	East Brunswick Township	Middlesex	06/10/1986	Link	NJD041828906	40.441322	-74.439636
Garden State Cleaners	Buena Borough	Atlantic	03/31/1986	Link	NJD053280160	39.51903	-74.94945
GEMS Landfill	Gloucester Township	Camden	09/08/1983	Link	NJD980529192	39.779141	-75.011928
Global Landfill	Old Bridge Township	Middlesex	03/31/1989	Link	NJD063160667	40.456567	-74.301588
Goose Farm	Plumsted Township	Ocean	09/08/1983	Link	NJD980530109	40.097227	-74.516290
Helen Kramer Landfill	Mantua Township	Gloucester	09/08/1983	Link	NJD980505366	39.786737	-74.201566
Hercules, Inc.	Greenwich Township	Gloucester	09/08/1983	Link	NJD002349058	39.829321	-75.279607
Higgins Disposal Services, Inc.	Franklin Township	Somerset	08/30/1990	Link	NJD053102232	40.388181	-74.614878
Higgins Farm	Franklin Township	Somerset	03/31/1989	Link	NJD981490261	40.398971	-74.610034
Horseshoe Road	Sayreville Borough	Middlesex	09/25/1995	LInk	NJD980663678	40.481131	-74.317950
Iceland Coin Laundry Area Ground Water Plume	Vineland City	Cumberland	08/22/1999	Link	NJ0001360882	39.459428	-75.043876
Imperial Oil Co./Champion Chemicals	Marlboro Township	Monmouth	09/08/1983	Link	NJD980654099	40.38436	-74.24479
Jones Industrial Services Landfill (JIS)	South Brunswick Township	Middlesex	09/08/1983	Link	NJD097400998	40.371699	-74.458088
Kauffman & Minteer, Inc.	Springfield Township	Burlington	03/31/1989	Link	NJD002493054	40.371699	-74.458088
Kin-Buc Landfill	Edison Township	Middlesex	09/08/1983	Link	NJD049860836	40.491966	-74.382748
Landfill & Development Company (L&D)	Mount Holly Township	Burlington	09/21/1984	Link	NJD048044325	39.977456	-74.759005
Lang Property	Pemberton Township	Burlington	09/08/1983	Link	NJD980505382	39.942854	-74.495539
LCP Chemicals, Inc.	Linden City	Union	07/28/1998	Link	NJD079303020	40.597985	-74.205304
L.E. Carpenter Company	Wharton Borough	Morris	07/22/1983	Link	NJD002168748	40.904523	-74.577169
Lightman Drum Company	Winslow Township	Camden	10/22/1999	Link	NJD014743678	39.748668	-74.912567
Lipari Landfill	Mantua Township	Gloucester	09/08/1983	Link	NJD980505416	39.748668	-74.912567
Lone Pine Landfill	Freehold Township	Monmouth	09/08/1983	Link	NJD980505424	40.202693	-74.332542
Martin Aaron, Inc.	Camden City	Camden	07/22/1999	Link	NJD014623854	39.926127	-75.118741
Maywood Chemical Sites	Maywood Borough, Rochelle Park Township & Lodi Borough	Bergen	9/8/1999	Link	NJD980529762	40.896228	-74.073029
McGuire Air Force Base #1	New Hanover Township	Burlington	10/22/1999	Link	NJ0570024018	40.038946	-74.590236
Middlesex Sampling Plant	Middlesex Borough	Middlesex	01/19/1999	Link	NJ0890090012	40.572043	-74.491919
Metaltec/Aerosystems	Franklin Borough	Sussex	9/8/1983	Link	NJD002517472	41.110723	-74.598756
Monitor Devices, Inc.	Wall Township	Monmouth	6/10/1983	Link	NJD980529408	40.184210	-74.115967
Montgomery Township Housing Development	Montgomery Township	Somerset	9/8/1983	Link	NJD980654164	40.410137	-74.645692
Myers Property	Franklin Township	Hunterdon	9/8/1983	Link	NJD980654198	40.594740	-74.934609
Nascolite Corporation	Millville City	Cumberland	9/21/1984	Link	NJD002362705	39.422209	-75.029815
Naval Air Engineering Center/Station	Manchester Township	Ocean	8/30/1990	Link	NJ7170023744	40.011558	-74.315017
Naval Weapons Station Earle	Colts Neck & Howell Township	Monmouth	8/30/1990	Link	NJ0170022172	40.265114	-74.162778
NL Industries, Inc.	Oldmans Township	Salem	9/8/1983	Link	NJD061843249	39.757063	-75.427472
Picatinny Arsenal	Rockaway Township	Morris	2/21/1990	Link	NJ3210020704	40.901746	-74.566474
PJP Landfill	Jersey City	Hudson	09/08/1983	Link	NJD980505648	40.734655	-74.079689
Pohatcong Valley Groundwater Contamination	Washington & Franklin Township	Warren	03/31/1989	Link	NJD981179047	40.704642	-75.015444
Price Landfill #1	Egg Harbor Township & Pleasantville City	Atlantic	09/08/1983	Link	NJD070281175	39.41528	-74.52695
Puchack Well Field	Pennsauken Township	Camden	03/06/1998	Link	NJD981084767	39.977448	-75.066963
Quanta Resources Corporation	Edgewater Borough	Bergen	09/05/2002	Link	NJD000606442	40.804517	-73.993026
Radiation Technology, Inc. (RTI)	Rockaway Township	Morris	09/21/1984	Link	NJD047684451	40.959797	-74.529739
Raritan Bay Slag	Old Bridge Township & Sayreville Borough	Middlesex	11/04/2009	Link	NJN000206276	40.464589	-74.258017
Reich Farm	Toms River	Ocean	09/08/1983	Link	NJD980529713	40.018873	-74.218644
Ringwood Mines landfill site	Ringwood Borough	Passaic	09/08/1983	Link	NJD980529739	41.142723	-74.269222
Rockaway Borough Well Field	Rockaway Borough	Morris	09/08/1983	Link	NJD980654115	40.903396	-74.508040
Rockaway Township Wells	Rockaway Township	Morris	09/08/1983	Link	NJD980654214	40.970956	-74.489769
Rocky Hill Municipal Wells	Rocky Hill Borough	Somerset	09/08/1983	Link	NJD980654156	40.403187	-74.638872
Roebling Steel	Florence Township	Burlington	09/08/1983	Link	NJD073732257	40.119668	-74.773020
Rolling Knolls Landfill	Chatham Township	Morris	09/23/2003	Link	NJD980505192	40.736796	-74.443120
Scientific Chemical Processing, Inc. (SCP Carlstadt)(Berrys Creek)	Carlstadt Borough	Bergen	09/08/1983	Link	NJD070565403	40.827103	-74.077153
Sharkey Landfill	Parsippany Troy-Hills Township & East Hanover	Morris	09/08/1983	Link	NJD980505762	40.848417	-74.350234
Shieldalloy Corporation	Newfield Borough	Gloucester	09/21/1984	Link	NJD002365930	39.551934	-75.014686
South Jersey Clothing Company	Buena Borough	Atlantic	10/04/1989	Link	NJD980766828	39.551934	-75.014686
Standard Chlorine Chemical Company, Inc.	Kearny Town	Hudson	09/19/2007	Link	NJD002175057	40.749184, -74.103918	40.749184, -74.103918
Swope Oil & Chemical Company	Pennsauken Township	Camden	07/22/1987	Link	NJD041743220	39.982334	-75.034156
Syncon Resins	Kearny Town	Hudson	09/08/1983	Link	NJD064263817	40.736684	-74.112377
United States Radium Corporation	Orange City	Essex	10/14/1985	Link	NJD980654172	40.781561	-74.228134
United States Avenue Burn	Gibbsboro Borough	Camden	07/22/1999	Link	NJ0001120799	39.830006	-74.965026
Universal Oil Products (UOP) (Berrys Creek)	East Rutherford	Bergen	09/08/1983	Link	NJD002005106	41.220012	-74.07943
Ventron/Velsicol (Berrys Creek)	Wood-Ridge, Carlstadt & Moonachie	Bergen	09/21/1984	Link	NJD980529879	40.844554	-74.07943
Vineland Chemical	Vineland City	Cumberland	09/21/1984	Link	NJD002385664	39.511428	-75.053943
Waldick Aerospace Devices, Inc.	Wall Township	Monmouth		Link	NJD054981337	40.142807	-74.060306
Welsbach/General Gas Mantle	Camden & Gloucester	Camden	06/17/1996	Link	NJD986620995	39.902412	-75.126149
White Chemical Company	Newark City	Essex	09/25/1991	Link	NJD980755623	40.698751	-74.197802
White Swan Cleaners/Sun Cleaners Area Ground Water	Wall Township	Monmouth	04/30/2003	Link	NJSFN0204241	40.135812	-74.062723
Williams Property	Middle Township	Cape May	09/08/1983	Link	NJD980529945	39.120423	-74.801558
Woodbrook Road Dump	South Plainfield Borough	Middlesex	04/30/2003	Link	NJSFN0204260	40.558574	-74.396850
Woodland Township Route 532 Dump	Woodland Township	Burlington	09/21/1984	Link	NJD980505887	39.820594	-74.529087
Woodland Township Route 72 Dump	Woodland Township	Burlington	09/21/1984	Link	NJD980505879	39.846684	-74.489037
Zschiegner Refining Company	Howell Township	Monmouth	09/08/1983	Link	NJD986643153	40.145125	-74.199117

== Proposed Sites ==
Sites Proposed for Addition to the NPL:

Site Name	Municipality	County	Date Proposed	Map	CERCLIS ID	Notes
Route 561 Dump	Gibbsboro Borough	Camden	07/28/1998		NJ0000453514	Sherwin Williams Property
Mansfield Trail Dump	Byram, New Jersey	Sussex	10/21/2010		NJN000206345	Mansfield Trail Dump

== Deleted Sites ==
Sites deleted from the NPL:

Site Name	Municipality	County	Date Listed	Date Deleted	Map	CERCLIS ID	Notes
Beachwood/Berkeley Wells	Beachwood Borough& Berkeley Township	Ocean	09/08/1983	01/06/1992		NJD980654123	
Combe Fill North Landfill	Mount Olive Township	Morris	09/08/1983	06/02/2004	Link	NJD980530596	
Cooper Road Drum Dump	Voorhees Township	Camden	09/21/1984	02/22/1989	Link	NJD980761381	
Delilah Road Landfill	Egg Harbor Township	Atlantic	09/21/1984	10/13/2009	Link	NJD980529002	
Denzer & Schafer X-Ray Company	Berkeley Township	Ocean	09/08/1983	12/29/1998	Link	NJD046644407	
Florence Land Recontouring Incorporated	Florence, Mansfield & Springfield	Burlington	09/21/1984	05/13/2004		NJD980529143	
Fort Dix Landfill	Pemberton Township	Burlington		(09/10/1999)		NJ2210020275	
Friedman Property	Upper Freehold Township	Monmouth	09/08/1983	03/07/1986		NJD980532832	
Glen Ridge Radium Sites	Glen Ridge Borough	Essex	02/14/1985	09/02/2009		NJD980785646	
Grand Street Mercury	Hoboken City	Hudson	09/25/1997	09/18/2007		NJ0001327733	
Hopkins Farm	Plumsted Township	Ocean		08/27/2002	Link	NJD980532840	
Industrial Latex	Wallington Borough	Bergen		04/21/2003	Link	NJD981178411	
Jackson Township Landfill	Jackson Township	Ocean		09/13/1995		NJD980505283	
Krysowaty Farm	Hillsborough Township	Somerset		02/22/1989		NJD980529838	
Lodi Municipal Wells	Lodi Borough	Bergen		12/29/1998		NJD980769301	
M&T Delisa Landfill	Ocean Township	Monmouth		03/21/1991	Link	NJD085632164	Seaview Square Mall now on this area
Mannheim Avenue Landfill	Galloway Township	Atlantic		08/27/2007	Link	NJD980654180	
Monroe Township Landfill	Monroe Township	Middlesex		02/03/1994		NJD980505671	
Montclair/ West Orange Radium Sites	Montclair & West Orange Township	Essex	09/15/2005	09/02/2009		NJD980785653	
Pepe Field	Boonton Town	Morris	09/06/2000	07/11/2003		NJD980529598	
Pijak Farm	Plumsted Township	Ocean	02/28/1996	03/03/1997	Link	NJD980532808	
Pomona Oaks Well Contamination	Galloway Township	Atlantic		05/07/1998	Link	NJD980769350	Residential Area
Renora, Inc.	Edison Township	Middlesex		03/20/2000		NJD070415005	
Ringwood Mines Landfill	Ringwood Borough	Passaic		11/02/1994		NJD980529739	Relisted in 2006
Sayreville Landfill	Sayreville Borough	Middlesex		11/15/2011	Link	NJD980505754	40.445298,-74.358377
South Brunswick Township Landfill	South Brunswick Township	Middlesex		02/27/1998		NJD980530679	BFI
Spence Farm	Plumsted Township	Ocean		03/03/1997	Link	NJD980532816	
Tabernacle Drum Dump	Tabernacle Township	Burlington		05/08/2008	Link	NJD980761357	
Upper Deerfield Township Sanitary Landfill	Upper Deerfield Township	Cumberland		06/09/2000	Link	NJD980761399	
Vineland Developmental Center	Vineland City	Cumberland		05/07/1998	Link	NJD980529887	
Wilson Farm	Plumsted Township	Ocean		09/08/2009	Link	NJD980532824	
Witco Chemical Corporation	Oakland Borough	Bergen		09/29/1995	Link	NJD045653854	
W. R. Grace & Company	Wayne Township	Passaic	09/08/1983	09/30/2012	Link	NJ1891837980	

== See also ==
- Brook Industrial Park Superfund Site
- List of Superfund sites in the United States
- List of environmental issues
- List of waste types
- TOXMAP
