= Emmell's Septic Landfill Superfund site =

Landfill in New Jersey, US

Coordinates: 39°30′04″N 74°32′36″W

Emmell's Septic Landfill (ESL) is a landfill in Galloway Township, New Jersey and takes up about 38 acres of space. The landfill was in operation from 1967 until 1979. ESL disposed of liquid and solid waste including many chemicals such as volatile organic compounds (VOCs), Polychlorinated Biphenyls (PCBs), Trichloroethene and Vinyl chloride which all had their own effect on the environment and community. These chemicals affected the groundwater required millions of dollars to reconstruct the groundwater pathways and provide clean water to residents. The landfill holds a Hazardous Ranking Score of a 50/100, qualifying for the Superfund National Priority List. In August 1999, the state acknowledged the site's contamination and held town meetings and provided research upon the site such as groundwater samples. In July 1997, a sitewide investigation was called upon by the United States Environmental Protection Agency. In total the clean up was estimated to cost $5 million to fund this superfund site, and a grant of $3.9 million was given by the Federal Government under the Recovery Act Funding (Previti). Today, the project is still ongoing however, greatly improved since the landfill was discovered.

== Origins ==
Galloway has a population of 37,431 as of 2015 and stands with a total of 115.213 square miles, 89.074 square miles of that being land and 26.139 square miles being water. Emmell's Septic Landfill is located in Galloway Township, occupying 38 acres and operated from 1967 to 1979. ELS disposed of both liquid and solid waste, dropping it into lagoons, ponds and trenches.

=== Town history ===
In 1774, the Township of Galloway was allowed to remain a perpetual township and community under the order of King George the third of England. Galloway Township was occupied by indigenous people for thousands of years including the Lenape Native American tribe during the time the Europeans emerged. The town got its name from an assemblyman, Joseph Galloway, whose land Galloway was located on prior to his move to England. As of 2015, Galloway Township had an estimated population of 37,431. The United States Census Bureau recorded Galloway Township having a total of 115.213 square miles, 89.074 square miles of that being land and 26.139 square miles being water. In 1979 Emmell's Septic Landfill was closed and in March and August the NJDHSS and the ATSDR visited the site.

=== Company history ===
ESL was in operation from 1967 until 1979. During this time, disposing of waste wherever convenient was common practice and in 1974, the site received a facility permit that authorized them to dispose sewage and septic waste in near waters. Emmell's Septic Landfill began to accept septic and sewage sludge and throw the waste into trenches and lagoons on site. “[...] both solid and chemical waste was also disposed of at the landfill, including drums containing paint sludges, gas cylinders, household garbage, and construction debris”. The landfill was under supervision for enforcement activities by the New Jersey Department of Environmental Protection from 1976 to 1980, due to the landfill not sending designs for the disposal of waste. In 1980, the public became aware of the pollution and fear was brought upon them, leading the 96th Congress to make the Superfund program to exterminate the contaminated sites. Emmell's Septic Landfill holds a Hazardous Ranking Score of a 50/100, qualifying for the Superfund National Priority List. To qualify for the Superfund National Priority List, a site must receive a score at or above 28.5. Emmell's Septic Landfill was “proposed for inclusion on the National Priority List (NPL) in April 1999, and was placed on the NPL on July 22, 1999”. In 1979 Emmell's Septic Landfill was closed and in March and August the NJDHSS and the ATSDR visited the site.

== Superfund designation ==
The site contamination was acknowledged by the state in August 1999, due to residents becoming concerned with their health upon the knowledge of Emmell's Septic Landfill's chemical waste history. Samples of groundwater were taken from private wells within the landfill site and showed elevated VOC levels, resulting in the NJDEP closing wells within a certain range from the site. In July 1997, a sitewide investigation was called upon by the United States Environmental Protection Agency. In total, the clean up was estimated to cost $5 million, and a grant of $3.9 million was given by the Federal Government under the Recovery Act Funding.

=== State intervention ===
A community meeting was requested by the United States Environmental Protection Agency and conducted on August 17, 1999. At this meeting the sampling from May (1999) was presented and the community was concerned with the safety of the well water and the health effects following. This meeting consisted of members from the community, along with the Agency for Toxic Substances and Disease Registry (ATSDR), the New Jersey Department of Health and Senior Services (NJDHSS), the Allegheny County Health Department (ACHD) and representatives of Galloway Township. Samples were collected to find out the length of contamination and from 1984 to 1988 samples were retracted from the private wells within the landfill's site. In less than 2,000 feet from the site the ACHD collected samples from residential wells in May and June 1984, showing elevated VOC's levels in the groundwater. With this evidence, the NJDEP closed the wells and established deeper wells ranging about 170–240 feet.

=== National intervention ===
A sitewide investigation was put into place by the United States Environmental Protection Agency (USEPA) in July 1997, and investigated the soil and groundwater to Public Health Assessment to discover the VOC contamination in the downstream residential wells source. The USEPA assessed the groundwater passage to the wells and sampled 31 private wells in 1999. It was estimated to cost up to $5 million to fund this superfund site. The Federal Government gave the site $3.9 million from the Recovery Act Funding, adding up to half the cost of the project.

== Health and environmental hazards ==
The chemicals that Emmell's Septic Lanndfill disposed of included solid and liquid chemical waste. These chemicals included volatile organic compounds (VOCs), Polychlorinated Biphenyls (PCBs), Trichloroethene and Vinyl chloride which all had their own effect on the environment and community. Millions of dollars were spent on the reconstruction due to the contamination of groundwater from the chemical waste that the landfill disposed of. Health effects such as cancer, lung and heart issues were resulted from the contamination of these chemicals.

=== Groundwater contamination ===
Emmell's Septic Landfill polluted the groundwater in Galloway Township by disposing septic and sewage into trenches and lagoons. This pollution affected the public due to groundwater being the main source of drinking water and irrigation for commercial crops within four miles from the site and at least 100 residents live within one half mile from it and 25 residents within 2,000 feet downstream from it. With people residing so close to the site, it posed a great risk to their health and the environment around them. The contaminated groundwater had traces of harmful compounds above the federal drinking standards, such as volatile organic compounds or VOCs, which evaporate in the air. VOC's are organic compounds that become a gas containing hydrogen, oxygen, fluorine, chlorine, bromine, sulfur, nitrogen and carbon. VOC's are harmful because they are a form of air pollutants when mixed with nitrogen oxides, forming ground-level ozone, adding to climate change. One element that was prominent in Emmell's Septic Landfill was Trichloroethylene. “Trichloroethylene is a colorless, volatile liquid … [that] evaporates quickly into the air”. Kidney and liver cancer along with malignant lymphoma are lifetime effects that follows trichloroethylene. The National Toxicology Program and the International Agency for Research on Cancer concluded that trichloroethylene is cancerous to humans, posing a great threat to human health within the area.

=== Polychlorinated piphenyls ===
A chemical that was improperly disposed of was polychlorinated biphenyls. Polychlorinated Biphenyls, or PCBs, are a liquid or solid containing a range of clear to a light yellow color and no smell or taste. It has been highly recorded that PCBs can cause acne or rashes when presented at high levels. Those exposed to PCBs in the work environment have reported nose and lung irritation, along with gastrointestinal issues, depression, fatigue and differences in their blood and liver. PCBs were subject to animal testing, recording liver damage and death in rats that consumed PCBs. Evidence of PCBs being associated to cancer in humans, for example liver and biliary tract have been proven in many studies of workers. The Department of Health and Human services, EPA, and the International Agency of Research on Cancer concluded that PCBs are likely to be cancerous to humans. These cancerous chemicals were disposed of in Emmell's Septic Landfill, leading to exposure to the residents of Galloway Township.

=== Trichloroethene ===
Another chemical that was improperly disposed of at Emmell's Septic Landfill was that of trichloroethene Trichloroethane contains no color and obtains a sweet smell, consisting of a high boiling point. If trichloroethane is released into the environment, it ends up being broken down into the air, and some cases groundwater too. If in the air, trichloroethane has a 49-day expectation to break down half way, therefore spreading far away from the origin before fully being broken down. If the chemical is underground, it is not expected to break down until about after 16 weeks, or even years. Exposure to trichloroethene can be from breathing it in or direct contact to it on the skin. Temporary side effects include stinging and burning of the skin upon contact. Animal testing has been used when finding out the effects of this chemical and shown that when trichloroethane is in the air or high doses are applied to the skin or ingested, has resulted in death to the animals. Long term effects include effects on the nervous system, liver, kidney, digestive tract, produce skin irritation and the body's ability to fight infections. Animal testing also showed that when given a high dosage, the mice developed liver cancer. The effects on humans are not confirmed, due to human testing not being conducted however, the effects on animals have been deathly and severe. Vinyl chloride is a colorless gas at room temperature and is unstable at high temperatures, and was also a chemical disposed of at the landfill. Studies have shown that when breathed in high levels, vinyl chloride will cause dizziness or sleepiness within 5 minutes, higher doses could cause one to pass out. Vinyl chloride was also tested on animals resulting in liver damage, along with the lungs and kidneys. Vinyl chloride was recorded to prevent blood clotting and damage to the heart and if in contact with the skin can numb the skin and show redness and blisters. These liquid chemicals were waste that Emmell's Liquid Landfill disposed of, leading to contamination to the groundwater of Galloway Township, putting the community at risk to the hazards above.

== Cleanup ==
The EPA's Removal Action Branch began an immediate action in July 1999, which fixed the sources of contamination that were still continuing. With this, the EPA removed all the waste that the landfill had disposed of and removed it from the site to a proper disposal facility. The groundwater was contaminated, leaving the residents unable to consume their water that was supplied from wells. This led to the EPA providing an alternative source of drinking water such as giving residents bottled water. The EPA dug deeper well pipes and connecting some residences’ water supply to a water company supply line. In 2012 the system the EPA provided to maintain safe drinking water was upgraded. As of today this process is still ongoing and has cost over $12 million

=== Initial cleanup ===
The EPA's Removal Action Branch, or RAB, executed an immediate action in July, 1999 to fix the sources of contamination that were continuing at the landfill such as the buried drums. The EPA removed the submerged cylinders, paint sludge waste and the contaminated soil and disposed these at a disposal facility away from the site from August 1999 to March 2000. From this, a total of "438 drums, 11 gas cylinders and 28,046 cubic yards of soil were addressed. … 3,500 gallons of bottled water [was supplied] to six residences near the site" (Search Superfund Site Information). The EPA asked the Agency for Toxic Substances and Disease Registry (ATSDR) in August 1999 for the health consequences that Emmell's contamination had caused. It was concluded that Emmell's caused a health hazard through the pathway of groundwater for the time the water was used by residents, but since the wells had closed the risk was no longer applicable. In 2003 the EPA ensured clean drinking water by connecting 36 residences’ water supply to a water company supply line. A few years later, the EPA again took action in 2008 and 2010 by installing deeper wells in a clean aquifer for 7 residents. This decade process was done to insure the safety of the residents by providing clean drinking water due to the main source being ground water and that being so badly contaminated. The EPA investigated eleven parties who were suspected to be involved within the site however, no parties have been identified.

=== Current status ===
In 2000, the EPA did a study to see if treatment of the groundwater was needed near the site, and it was concluded that " ... a site-related VOC plume consisting primarily of trichloroethene, 1,2-dichloroethene and vinyl chloride as well as petroleum-related VOCs and chlorinated benzene compounds extended east of the landfill". A plan to treat the contaminated groundwater was decided in September 2003. This plan called to pump and treat the groundwater, controlling the migration of it off the site. The plan began to operate in September 2010. In 2012, the system was upgraded so the captured groundwater can be treated downstream from the property and today this process is still ongoing. The groundwater extraction system has cured about 573 million gallons of contaminated groundwater, they removed 35,000 tons of PCB- contaminated soil and 42 residents were supplied with an alternate water supply. This process has cost the EPA over $12 million.

== See also ==
- List of Superfund sites in New Jersey
