= Brook Industrial Park Superfund Site =

Industrial area in New Jersey, United States

Coordinates: 40.5599°N 74.5371°W

Brook Industrial Park (BIP) is an industrial area occupying 4.5 acres of the Borough of Bound Brook, New Jersey, in the United States of America. It is located on the northern bank of the Raritan River. Industrial, chemical and pesticide operations began in 1971 and eventually lead to the contamination of groundwater and exposure of workers to harmful dioxins. Throughout 1980 to 1988 the United States Environmental Protection Agency (EPA) and the New Jersey Department of Environmental Protection (NJDEP) conducted studies to determine if there were any threats being posed on the workers, community or environment by the BIP companies in their disposal of processed and stored chemicals.

Three companies were identified as being involved in the contamination: Blue Spruce Chemical, Jame Fine Chemicals Inc., and National Metal Finishings Corp. In 1994, a Record of Decision (ROD) which is a document containing the remediation tactic for a waste site, was made involving excavation, disposal and treatment of soil and groundwater. Currently no further actions have been planned however the site is still on the National Priorities List (NPL) due to the ongoing treatment of groundwater.

== Origins ==
The Brook Industrial Park (BIP) is located in the Borough of Bound Brook in the Somerset County of New Jersey. The town is linked to the Raritan River by a stream, giving recreational use to the town’s people. Contamination of this river and the BIP’s soil and groundwater was discovered to be the result of misconduct of three companies. Blue Spruce Chemical, stored the defoliant “Agent Orange” and admitted to recklessly acting and putting others at risk by spilling pesticides. Jame Fine Chemicals Inc. discharged unpermitted wastewater into the Raritan River. National Metal Finishings Corp. discharged waste into groundwater.

=== Town history ===
Bound Brook, New Jersey is located in the Somerset county. It was first settled in 1681, and is currently with a population of 10,402 according to the 2010 United States Census. The town has a stream that flows into the Raritan River via GreenBrook on the eastern side of the borough. The source of the borough's name is the brook that was mentioned as a boundary in a Native American deed. The current mayor is Robert P. Fazen, however during the superfund designation it was Mayor Ronald Fasanello.

=== Company history ===
Blue Spruce Chemical had formulated, mixed and stored pesticides from 1971 to 1982, after which the building was abandoned. Pollution of the BIP area was revealed after a neighbouring company showed concern to the Middle Brook Regional Health Commission in 1980. The New Jersey Department of Environmental Protection (NJDEP) and Middle-Brook Regional Health Commission investigated the facility due to reports of worker illnesses finding “inadequate waste disposal and housekeeping practices” due to “frequent spills of pesticides”. In 1983, the NJDEP did testing to which dioxin concentrations greater than one part per billion were found, considered hazardous and action level by the State of New Jersey. This led to the State taking action by conducting a remedial investigation/feasibility study (RI/FS) in order to collect data on site conditions, nature of the waste, assess risk to human health and the environment, and evaluate alternative remedial actions. “In 1986, the company's owner pleaded guilty to criminal negligence in spilling pesticides during repackaging between 1977 and 1980.” so the company had admitted to reckless action that had the potential to harm someone.

National Metal Finishings Inc. is a metal plating facility that had in 1985 received financial penalties from the State for unreported discharge of waste into groundwater over a ten-year period, and failure to comply with remedy actions recommended.

Jame Fine Chemical Inc. had discharged unpermitted water into the Raritan River, and analysis of nearby pond samples showed high concentrations of volatile organic substances such as methylene chloride and trichloroethylene leading to an order in 1980 to end the releasing of wastewater into the river and to follow recommendations of treatment and disposal of waste. In 1982 a Civil Order was filed for liability cleanup meaning the government had found the company financially responsible for the reversal of damage it had originally caused. In 1984 and 1986 Jame Fine was cited for violations of the Resource, Conservation, and Recovery Act (RCRA), the public law that creates the framework for the proper management of hazardous and non-hazardous solid waste.

== Superfund designation ==
Studies done by the New Jersey Department of Environmental Protection (NJDEP) throughout 1980 to 1988 lead to the discovery of soil and groundwater contamination due to various waste dumping and chemical spills that exceeded the State’s action level resulting in the Brook Industrial Park being placed on the National Priorities List (NPL) in 1989.

=== State intervention ===
The NJDEP and Middle-Brook Regional Health Commission investigated the Blue Spruce Chemical facility due to reports of worker illnesses in 1982. Testing was conducted in 1983, once the building was abandoned, finding concerning results and leading to the involvement of the United States Environmental Protection Agency (EPA). The NJDEP installed four monitoring wells around Blue Spruce Chemical facility in 1980 and samples for further analysis were taken. Samples of the Jame Fine production were taken in 1980 and 1982 for comparison to NJ Federal health-based drinking water standards. In 1989, a site visit was conducted by the New Jersey Department Of Health (NJDOH) and NJDEP finding the adjacent areas to the abandoned Blue Spruce building not closed off and evidence of worker activity.

=== National intervention ===
In July 1983, the Comprehensive Environmental Response, Compensation, and Liability Act (CERCLA) emergency funds were used by the EPA in order to lock the Blue Spruce building and cover the dioxin-contaminated area with asphalt as well as conducting a RI/FS. Additionally, in 1990, fencing was installed to eliminate accidental contact with contaminants within the soil. Eventually the Brook Industrial Park was added to the NPL in March 1989, ranked 13 of 108 NPL sites in New Jersey. Representatives of an Edison firm the EPA had hired, ICF Technology Inc. examined the site as part of the remedial investigation in the late December 1989. 1994 involved the EPA signing a Record of Decision (ROD) for the remedy of the site which included excavation, off site treatment and disposal of soil, groundwater, and building.

== Health and environment hazards ==
Community concerns involved the continuing use of contaminated groundwater for drinkable and domestic uses, as well as the worker population facing risk of exposure to hazardous substances through inhalation, skin contact or ingestion, and the nearby residents to volatile organic compounds (VOCs), heavy metals and pesticides. The site is seen as a contributor to the rate of cancer in Bound Brook as stated by the Bound Brook Health Department.

=== TCDD Contamination ===
Blue Spruce Chemical was known to have been involved in storing the defoliant Agent Orange which consists of 2,4-dichlorophenoxyacetic acid (2,4-D) and 2,4,5-trichlorophenoxyacetic acid (2,4,5-T) containing traces of 2,3,7,8-tetrachlorodibenzo-p-dioxin (TCDD). A sampling program was conducted by EPA contractors in 1983 in and around the Blue Spruce facility for possible TCDD contamination finding soil contamination ranging from 0.77 to 6.2 parts per billion (ppb) in northern and southern sides of the building whilst 5.7 ppb inside at ground level and 6.1 ppb in the basement, highly over the New Jersey State action level of 1 ppb. This dioxin has been classified as cancer causing to humans by the EPA explaining the Bound Brook Health Department’s concern of the contamination being linked to the amount of cancer in the area.

=== Groundwater contamination ===
Residents of Bound Brook were advised by the Bound Brook Health Department against the consumption and use of private well water in 1981, however there had been records that showed well use was continued. Public wells within 3 miles of the site provide water to an estimated 290,000 people whilst the Raritan River is used for recreational and commercial purposes. Analysis of water run off samples and monitoring wells installed around the Blue Spruce facility provided evidence of Dichlorodiphenyltrichloroethane (DDT) and its breakdown products malathion, lindane and aldrin, as well as VOCs and pesticide compounds. Lindane and aldrin were also detected by the NJDEP downstream of the Raritan River. DDT is an endocrine disruptor (interferes with the endocrine or hormonal system), also considered likely to be a human carcinogen. The analysis of discharge water from the Jame Fine Inc. and ponded water samples in the area in 1980 showed many contaminants including methylene chloride, a possible carcinogenic and known inhalation hazard, broken down by the body to carbon monoxide potentially leading to carbon monoxide poisoning. Another contaminant being trichloroethylene, a producer of central nervous system depression resulting in insensitivity to pain, workplace exposure to this chemical has been associated with toxic effects in the liver and kidney.

=== Inadequate safety measures ===
Workers of the National Metal Furnishings Inc. had exposure to metal plating solvents and chromic acid documented in September 1982 by the Middle-Brook Regional Health Commission, finding the safety measures to protect workers from this exposure to be inadequate. The personnel working in the BIP risk exposure to the various contaminants through inhalation of vapours and direct skin contact with liquids or surfaces.

=== Raritan River ecosystem ===
Surface runoff water from the site to the Raritan River lead to the contamination of the river’s ecosystem with pesticides, TCDD, heavy metals and VOCs. Aquatic organisms are exposed to possible contact with these toxic substances and being poisoned or accumulating the contaminants within them.

== Clean up ==
A Record of Decision (ROD), document involving the actions to remedy the hazardous site, was signed in 1994 by the EPA for various extractions and treatments of soil and groundwater. By 2006 all planned actions had been completed and a construction of a groundwater pump-and-treat system was in place. This system is currently in use and all industrial standards of the Brook Industrial Park had been restored.

=== Initial cleanup ===
The first operation was the emergency action in 1983 of the EPA securing the Blue Spruce Chemical building and covering any dioxin-contaminated area with asphalt. Once the site had been added to the NPL long term action was planned with RI/FS being conducted among other surveys determining the nature and extent of overall contamination. The treatment selected for the site was done in 1994, with the EPA signing a Record of Decision (ROD) for the “disposal of approximately 5,000 cubic yards of contaminated soil; demolition and disposal/incineration of the contaminated portions of the Blue Spruce building; and extraction and treatment of contaminated groundwater, followed by reinjection of the treated water.” followed by the demolition of the building in August 1999, “along with the removal and disposal of approximately 500 cubic yards of wood, 400 tons of brick and concrete, and 500 tons of contaminated soil from the basement of the building”. By September 2006 the contaminated soil had all been removed, and a construction of the groundwater pump-and-treat system began and was completed in the summer, operating to this day.

=== Current status ===
All long-term actions have been completed apart from the ongoing groundwater pumping and treatment. The Brook Industrial Park remediated to industrial standards all remaining buildings on site, and they are available for light industrial use. Companies on site include: Jame Fine Chemicals, Inc. operating a pharmaceutical manufacturing operation and National Metal Finishings Corporation, continuing metal plating processes.

== See also ==
- List of Superfund sites in New Jersey
