= Imperial Oil (Superfund site) =

Coordinates: 40.384084°N 74.245514°W

- Superfund site
- Location within Monmouth County, New Jersey Location within New Jersey
- Location: Marlboro, Monmouth, New Jersey

Information
- CERCLIS ID: NJD980654099
- Contaminants: Volatile organic compounds (VOCs), PCBs, metals, polycyclic aromatic hydrocarbons (PAHs), petroleum hydrocarbons, and phthalates
- Responsible parties: Various

Progress
- Proposed: December 30, 1982
- Listed: September 8, 1983
- Construction completed: June 26, 2023

Imperial Oil is a current Superfund site located off Orchard Place near Route 79 in Morganville, Marlboro Township, Monmouth County, New Jersey. This site is one of 114 Superfund sites in New Jersey. It is in the U.S. Environmental Protection Agency (EPA) Region 2 Superfund area of control and organization. The 15-acre (61,000 m^{2}) Imperial Oil Co./Champion Chemicals site consisted of six production, storage, and maintenance buildings and 56 above-ground storage tanks.

== History ==
Industrial operations began in 1912 at the 15-acre (61,000 m^{2}) Imperial Oil site when arsenic compounds were manufactured. An oil reclamation facility operated from 1950 to 1969 removing metals and PCBs from waste oil. While leased from Champion Chemicals, Imperial Oil Company blended oil at this site since 1969. However, this was not the only contamination to the site as several companies have operated at the site in the past. One, which reprocessed waste oil, may have discharged wastes to a nearby stream; another company produced arsenical pesticides. The site formerly contained a waste pile contaminated with polychlorinated biphenyls (PCBs). The soil at the site is contaminated with volatile organic compounds (VOCs), PCBs, metals, polycyclic aromatic hydrocarbons (PAHs), petroleum hydrocarbons, and phthalates, a plastics by-product. The site was added to the National Priorities List of Superfund sites in 1983. Imperial Oil continued to operate — with millions of dollars in U.S. military contracts — until 2007, when it went bankrupt.

== Surrounding areas ==
According to the 2000 Census, there is 406,326 people living within 10 miles (16 km) of this site. The superfund site is currently surrounded by a large hurricane fence to prevent unauthorized entry into the site. Surrounding the site are many areas that also may be critically affected by the contaminants in the soil and water, including wetlands, wooded areas, streams, ponds and lakes. When investigated, off-site sediments were contaminated with arsenic, lead, phthalates, and PCBs. The surface soil is contaminated with heavy metals including chromium, lead, and arsenic, and PCBs with surface water containing arsenic.

On April 15, 2004, properties adjacent to the Imperial Oil Superfund site in Marlboro Township were the focus of a clean-up. More than 18,000 yd^{3} (14,000 m^{3}) of contaminated sediment and soil were removed from Birch Swamp Brook and adjacent properties between the Imperial Oil site and Texas Road. Restoration of the brook and adjacent properties has followed in phases upon completion of excavation work. The contamination on the site affects the ground water at Englishtown Aquifer, an important source of water supply for Monmouth and Northern Ocean County residents.

== Current site status ==
In 1991, the EPA excavated and disposed of approximately 660 yd^{3} (500 m^{3}) of PCB-contaminated material from a waste filter clay pile located on-site. The contaminated soil beneath the former pile is covered with an impermeable material to prevent the infiltration of water and to prevent human contact. EPA installed extraction wells and an oil/water treatment system to remove the floating oil layer from the ground water. The New Jersey Department of Environmental Protection (NJDEP) is currently using these wells to continue the removal of floating oil. To date, NJDEP has removed over 20,000 US gal (76,000 L; 17,000 imp gal) of PCB-contaminated oil. In 1998, EPA excavated and disposed of 6,488 yd^{3} (4,960 m^{3}) of contaminated soil (roughly equivalent to one football field, covered one yard deep) from four nearby residences. NJDEP completed a study determining the full nature and extent of the contamination. The cleanup plan calls for the excavation and off-site disposal of contaminated soil and removal and off-site incineration of floating product; dismantling buildings and tank farms needed to complete the soil excavation; and restoring wetlands. In 2004, NJDEP excavated and disposed of 14,889 yd^{3} (11,383 m^{3}) of contaminated soil and sediment from the Birch Swamp Brook and adjacent properties. In April 2009, Congressman Rush Holt announced Imperial Oil Superfund site is expected to get a $25 million-plus allotment of cash to complete the clean-up efforts. Mayor Hornik said "With this allocation of federal funds, the final stages of the cleanup of the Imperial Oil Site can begin."

== Current funding status ==
To date, EPA has obligated approximately $26.6 million to the site.

== Responsible parties ==
The following parties are potentially responsible for paying for the clean-up of the site:

- Champion Chemical (Morganville, NJ): Champion Chemical agreed to pay EPA $6 million in a settlement with the EPA. Champion failed to make payments required under a consent decree that both Champion and Imperial Oil had entered into with EPA in 2001. Under the consent decree, the settling parties had agreed to make monthly payments to the United States of $12,500, as well as other amounts as specified in the decree. EPA filed a motion to enforce the decree in spring 2007.
- Collier, Jacob & Sweet (Somerset, NJ)
- Imperial Oil Company (Morganville, NJ): Inappropriate work conditions and a lack of secondary spill containment led the DEP to fine Imperial Oil $15,000 in 2004.
- J & M Land Company (Atlantic City, NJ)
- Jersey Central Power & Light (Morristown, NJ)
- Stevens, Emil & June

== See also ==
- List of Superfund sites in New Jersey
