= Pohatcong Valley Groundwater Contamination =

Coordinates: 40°45′N 75°00′W

The Pohatcong Valley Groundwater Contamination superfund site is located in Warren County, Franklin Township, Washington Township, and Washington Borough in New Jersey. It was recognized in the 1970s but not designated into the National Priorities List until 1989. It is a contamination of the Kittany Limestone Aquifer underlying the Pohatcong Valley. This toxic site stretches across 9,800 acres of land. The chemicals that are polluting the groundwater and soil are trichloroethylene (TCE) and perchloroethylene (PCE). If someone were to be exposed to these harmful toxins for a short amount of time it can result in unconsciousness. Long term effects unfortunately include liver and kidney problems. The plans to clean up this superfund site are costing the companies involved, Pechiney Public Packaging Inc., Bristol Meyers Squibb Company, Albea Americas Inc, and Citigroup Inc, about $92 million, and the situation still has not been completely resolved.

== Origins ==
Pohatcong Township is located in Warren County, New Jersey, United States. It was established in 1881. Franklin Township is in Warren County, New Jersey and was established in 1839. Washington Township is also a part of Warren County, New Jersey. It was established as a township in 1849. Lastly, Washington is a borough of Warren County, and similar to Pohatcong and Washington Township, lies in the easternmost region of the Lehigh Valley.

=== Town history ===
Established in 1881, “The name Pohatcong Township is alleged to come from the Lenni Lenape Native American term that means ‘stream between split hills’”. The Native Americans used that phrase to describe the area most likely because of its appearance. It was created by being divided off of Greenwich Village in 1882. The recorded population in 2010 was 3,339.

==== Franklin Township ====
Franklin Township's population as of the 2010 United States census was 3,176. The township is named after Benjamin Franklin and was incorporated from portions of Greenwich Township, Mansfield Township and Oxford Township.

==== Washington township ====
Washington Township's most recent population count was recorded in 2010, which came out to be 6,651. “It is actually one of 6 municipalities in the state of New Jersey with the name Washington”. It was named for the first president of the United States, George Washington. Portions of the township were split up in 1868 to make up Washington Borough.

==== Washington Borough ====
According to the latest Washington Borough census, the latest population count in 2010 was a recorded 6,461. A New Jersey Legislature made that it was incorporated as a borough in 1868. It was also named for George Washington, making it one of more than ten communities named after him.

=== Company history ===
Pechiney Plastic Packaging Inc. was established in 1999, based out of Chicago, IL. They sell plastic packaging products such as dairy, meat, types of healthcare, and specialty products. Bristol Meyers Squibb Company is a worldwide industry founded in 1858 based out of New York City, NY. Albea Americas Inc began operating in 2010 and is a steel mill located in Washington, NJ. Rexam Beverage Can Company is another worldwide company that's main facility is in the United Kingdom. Lastly, the Citigroup Inc is globally functioning in over 160 countries. It was founded in 1812, and works as a global financial service company.

== Superfund designation ==
Pohatcong Valley's danger was recognized in the late 1970s. It was not until 1989, when the area was added to the National Priorities List (NPL) as an active superfund site.

=== State intervention ===
It took about a full decade for EPA to add Pohatcong Valley to the NPL. At that time there was a total of two infected public supply wells. It was not until the mid-1980s when a recorded 79 properties were contaminated with high levels of PCE and TCE that the state began to be concerned. Then in 1989, the government designated an EPA that established Pohatcong Valley as an active superfund site.

=== National intervention ===
It took the national government about two full decades for them to take action in the Pohatcong Valley superfund sites. There were many recorded contaminations in the area, but it was not an alarming amount until 1989. They began soil samples, monitoring of the wells, and aquifer testing.

== Health and environmental hazards ==
This superfund site consists of two dangerous chemical compounds, trichloroethylene (TCE) and perchloroethylene (PCE). Both consist of very harmful toxins that have long term effects on the central nervous system. PCE is generally used for dry cleaning fabrics and decreasing metals, while TCE is typically used as an industrial solvent. The short-term effects of PCE can include unconsciousness, and the long term effects often include liver and kidney damage. At this site its environmental issues include the contamination of soil and groundwater. The health concerns come from the private unfiltered wells that produce drinking water opposed to the public water supply.

=== Short-term health effects ===
Human exposure to PCE and TCE can have lasting effects on a person. Some of the short-term effects of these chemicals include dizziness, unconsciousness, irritation in the eyes and upper respiratory tract, severe shortness of breath, sweating, nausea, sleepiness, confusion, and impairment of coordination.

=== Long-term health effects ===
The more serious issues that can be developed from PCE and TCE include kidney and liver damage, problems with one's immune system, central nervous system, and respiratory failure. If you are pregnant, exposure to these chemicals can cause a series of birth defects, as well as developmental and reproductive issues.

=== Environmental effects ===
PCE and TCE create unsafe drinking water. When they are released into the soil it evaporates very quickly into the air because of its high vapor pressure and low rate of adsorption in soil. It is extremely toxic to aquatic organisms.

== Clean up ==
Clean up started up in 1999 and the process included action such as “...sampling private wells at off-site properties, conducting soil sampling, soil gas surveys, aquifer testing and a geological survey”. Clean up continued in 2006 with three different plans specifically for each area that is contaminated. The process is still underway and remains an active superfund site.

=== Initial cleanup ===
The first recorded cleanup process began in 1999 and “...it entailed installing groundwater monitor wells and temporary well points, sampling private wells at off-site properties, conducting soil sampling, soil gas surveys, aquifer testing and a geological survey”. This process was to find out exactly what was the extent of the contamination and to evaluate the extent of the environmental and human health risks.

=== Current status ===
The next steps into resolving the issue of this superfund site began taking place in 2006. Due to the outstanding 9,800-acre contaminated area, it was divided into three sections. Washington Borough, Franklin Township, and Washington Township all have individual plans to further the cleanup process. Washington Borough called for the contaminated groundwater to be pumped out of the ground, cleaned and then put back. Franklin Township went about it with a more personal approach. Individual homes with toxic water wells received their own treatment systems. Washington Township has contaminated soil that “...Pechiney and Albea are yet to determine who is responsible to clean that area”.
