= Price Landfill =

Hazardous site in New Jersey, USA

Coordinates: 39.4153°N 74.5265°W

Price Landfill is a 26-acre site located in Pleasantville, Egg Harbor Township, Atlantic County, New Jersey. Price Landfill is also known as Price Sanitary Landfill, Prices Pit, Price Landfill No.1 and Price Chemical Dump. The United States Environmental Protection Agency (USEPA) added Price Landfill to the Superfund National Priorities List on September 20, 1983, because of the hazardous chemicals found on the site and in the groundwater. The site was originally owned by Mr. Charles Price and was used to mine sand and gravel, which was shut down in 1968. The site was then turned into a private landfill in 1969 and then a commercial solid waste landfill in 1971. At this point the landfill was used to dispose of liquid waste by companies, specifically Atlantic City Electric Company. The liquid waste consisted of industrial chemicals, oils and greases/sludges, septic tank and sewer wastes, which were disposed on the site for 8 years, ending altogether in 1976, but in the meantime, having contaminated the groundwater, soil, air, and nearby creeks, specifically Absecon Creek. Chemicals dumped on the site are believed to be 1,2-Dichloroethane, arsenic, benzene, chloroform, lead, and vinyl chloride, all of which contaminated the groundwater, soil, air, and nearby creeks. The USEPA originally got involved in 1982 by beginning to correct the damage. Currently the USEPA states that they are continuing to monitor and treat the groundwater and land, and that hazards to humans are controlled.

== Origins ==
Price Landfill is located in the city of Pleasantville, New Jersey, on the west side of Mill Road just north of that street's intersection with Leeds Avenue. Pleasantville is a small city in the Township of Egg Harbor that lies along the coast of southern New Jersey, just five miles from Atlantic City, New Jersey. The site of Price Landfill was contaminated with many hazardous chemicals from many companies, specifically Atlantic City Electric Company.

=== Town history ===
Price Landfill is a 26-acre site located in the city of Pleasantville, New Jersey. Pleasantville is a small city in Atlantic County, NJ, which according to the United States Census Bureau is 5.69 square miles as of 2010. Pleasantville was originally a borough and was officially announced as a city on April 14, 1914. Dr. David Ingersoll named this city Pleasantville because of its surroundings, as stated in the book, The Origin of New Jersey Place Names. The City of Pleasantville consists of stores, houses, schools, beaches and people, just like most cities around the United States. Pleasantville's mayor is Jesse L. Tweedle, Sr., accompanied by Linda D. Peyton, City Administrator, and the rest of their team. The community consists of 20,249 diverse people who reside within 6,699 homes, as stated in the United States Census of 2010. The town is just 5 miles from downtown Atlantic City, where the famous New Jersey shoreline and casinos are located. Also located nearby are Abescon, Northfield and Ventnor City.

=== Company history ===
Atlantic City Electric Company was founded in 1924 and is a part of Exelon Corporation. Atlantic City Electric Company, Inc. was the respondent to the administrative settlement agreement proposed by the USEPA in order to comply with the Comprehensive Environmental Response, Compensation and Liability Act (CERCLA) in 2011. This means that Atlantic City Electric Company, Inc. was the one being held liable for the overall damage to the Price Landfill Site. Although, 36 other companies and people also dumped at this site, the companies were mostly in connection to Atlantic City Electric Company, Inc. Before being used by Atlantic City Electric Company, Price Landfill was used as a sand and gravel excavation site owned by Mr. Charles Price, which was closed in 1968. The site was dug up to within 2 feet of the water table, which is the area of the ground that is above the area of groundwater. The site, which is now considered an inactive landfill, used to accept tons of chemical waste, whether in barrels, some of which have been punctured, or just poured directly onto the site.

== Superfund designation ==
In the early 1980s, residents of the area surrounding Price Landfill became aware of the contaminants in their personal well water, as well as the Atlantic City Well Field. Price Landfill was placed on the National Priorities List on September 20, 1983.

=== State intervention ===
Many people in the area of Price Landfill own residential wells, which were found to be contaminated with volatile organic compounds, including benzene & chloroform, and arsenic in 1980. In 1980, officials of the state and locals came to the conclusion that the contaminated groundwater from the landfill was present in nearby private wells, as well as the Atlantic City Well Field, which is one mile from the landfill, and that this was a threat to the health of the community.

=== National intervention ===
The United States Environmental Protection Agency (EPA) originally became involved in the site in 1982. The EPA placed the Price Landfill on the National Priorities List of Superfund Sites in 1983 in response to the results from the New Jersey Department of Environmental Protection (NJDEP) Remedial Investigation and Feasibility Study to determine the significance of the contamination and how to clean it up. The EPA issued a Record of Decision in 1983, which moved the Atlantic City Well Field to another location, which took 2 years. The EPA also provided people affected by the contamination with public water supplies, such as bottled water. One year after work was complete, in 1986, the EPA issued a second ROD that stated their next moves for Price Landfill, which included:

the installation of a security fence around the landfill site; the installation of groundwater extraction wells adjacent to the landfill to control the contaminant sources; installation of groundwater extraction wells hydraulically downgradient from the landfill to abate the contaminant plume; construction of a groundwater/ leachate pretreatment facility at or near the site; construction of a force main to the ACMUA interceptor system; extraction of contaminated groundwater, followed by pretreatment, and ultimate disposal and treatment at the ACMUA waste water treatment plant; quarterly monitoring of ground water quality for approximately 25 years; construction of a landfill cap at the conclusion of the groundwater extraction process. The estimated capital cost is $9,050,000 with annual O&M for years 1-5 of $1,010,000 and $255,000 for years 6-25.

The EPA plans to build a fence around the site, build a system on the site to pump out the contaminated groundwater, clean and pretreat it, and send it to the Atlantic County Wastewater Treatment Facility to be further cleaned. At the end of the groundwater cleanup, the landfill will be capped, and the EPA will monitor the effects of this process within the next 25 years, which will cost a total of $9,050,000. The EPA later changed this plan because the Wastewater Treatment Facility changed their policies and would no longer accept the water from the landfill. The EPA and the NJDEP decided to build an on-site system which would clean the water of the chemicals, treat it and move it away from the site. The system was completed in 2000 and cleans and treats approximately 100,000 gallons of groundwater daily. This cleaning and treatment system was monitored for the following two years, and in 2002 the NJDEP began designing plans for the landfill cap and a better water cleaning and treating system. Completion of the design was expected in 2004. Construction of the groundwater treatment system was expected to be complete in late 2012, a year after the design for the landfill cap was complete. The final step of the second Record of Decision, the construction of a cap on the landfill, was originally expected to be finished in 2014, though as of December 2017, the cap is not complete.

== Health and environmental hazards ==
The site is suspected to have 9 million gallons of industrial waste, which has caused groundwater to become contaminated with the chemical wastes, causing multiple people who neighbor the site to not be able to use the water. The chemicals dumped are 1,2- Dichloroethane, arsenic, benzene, chloroform, lead, and vinyl chloride. All of which contaminated either the groundwater, soil, air, or nearby creeks.

=== 1,2-Dichloroethane ===
1,2-Dichloroethane is recognized as a carcinogen, meaning it can cause cancer if one is exposed to it for a long period of time. This chemical is highly flammable and has a strong, harsh scent and no color. There are eight tests that can be conducted to identify this chemical in a lab. It is ranked in the top 10% of the most hazardous compounds to human health and the environment, based on how toxic it is when ingested or inhaled, how it affects human health, cancer and noncancer risk scores through air and water, and how toxic it is to the environment. The overall hazard value of the chemical is 39, which puts it within the 100th percentile of other chemicals, making it in the top 10%. This chemical was found in the groundwater of the Price Landfill. 1,2- Dichloroethane can negatively affect health in these areas: Cardiovascular or Blood Toxicant, Developmental Toxicant, Gastrointestinal or Liver Toxicant, Kidney Toxicant, Neurotoxicant, Reproductive Toxicant, Respiratory Toxicant, and Skin or Sense Organ Toxicant. This means it can: cause blood diseases or abnormal heartbeat; affect the development of an unborn child; liver damage and disease; cause kidney disease which can lead to cancer; affect how the nerves carry information through the bodies peripheral nervous system which weakens the lower half of the body causing a tingling sensation and loss of coordination; affect fertility and may even cause the loss of a fetus during pregnancy; cause respiratory damage which can lead to cancer; cause hearing loss or other damage of the five senses.

=== Arsenic ===
Arsenic is described as a metal, or a metal-type, meaning it is not usually found as pure metal. Arsenic can be found in wood preservatives, pesticides or in the manufacturing of some glass. Arsenic was found in groundwater and surface water at the Price Landfill site. Arsenic is recognized as a carcinogen, meaning it can cause cancer if one is exposed to it for a long period of time. It is also ranked in the top 10% of the most hazardous chemicals to human health and the environment, based on how toxic it is when ingested or inhaled, cancer and noncancer risk scores through air and water, and how toxic it is to the environment. The overall hazard value of the chemical is 30, which puts it in the 100th percentile of other chemicals, making it in the top 10% of hazardous compounds. The chemical can negatively affect health in these areas: Developmental Toxicant, Cardiovascular or Blood Toxicant, Endocrine Toxicant, Gastrointestinal or Liver Toxicant, Immunotoxicant, Kidney Toxicant, Neurotoxicant, Reproductive Toxicant, Respiratory Toxicant, Skin or Sense Organ Toxicant. This means it can: affect the development of an unborn child; cause blood diseases or abnormal heartbeat; weaken the endocrine system leading to diabetes, hormone imbalances, reproductive disorders or cancer; cause liver damage and disease; weaken the immune system which can lead to disease or cancer; cause kidney disease which can lead to cancer; affect how the nerves carry information through the bodies peripheral nervous system which weakens the lower half of the body causing a tingling sensation and loss of coordination; affect fertility and may even cause the loss of a fetus during pregnancy; cause respiratory damage which can lead to cancer; cause hearing loss or other damage of the 5 senses.

=== Benzene ===
Benzene is a clear liquid and can be described as being sweet smelling. It was once one of the top 20 used chemicals in the United States, being found in gasoline, rubber, plastics, oils, and even explosives. Benzene is also a carcinogen, meaning it can cause cancer if one is exposed to it for a long period of time. It is ranked in the top 10% of the most hazardous compounds to human health and the environment, based on how toxic it is when ingested or inhaled, how it affects human health, workers exposure to the chemical, cancer and noncancer risk scores through air and water, and how toxic it is to the environment. The overall hazard value of the chemical is 48, which puts it within the 100th percentile of other chemicals, making it in the top 10% of hazardous compounds. This chemical can cause the following negative health effects: Developmental Toxicant, Reproductive Toxicant, Cardiovascular or Blood Toxicant, Endocrine Toxicant, Gastrointestinal or Liver Toxicant, Immunotoxicant, Neurotoxicant, Respiratory Toxicant, Skin or Sense Organ Toxicant. This means it can: affect the development of an unborn child; affect fertility and may even cause the loss of a fetus during pregnancy; cause blood diseases or abnormal heartbeat; weaken the endocrine system leading to diabetes, hormone imbalances, reproductive disorders or cancer; cause liver damage and disease; weaken the immune system which can lead to disease or cancer; affect how the nerves carry information through the bodies peripheral nervous system which weakens the lower half of the body causing a tingling sensation and loss of coordination; cause respiratory damage which can lead to cancer; cause hearing loss or other damage of the five senses.

=== Chloroform ===
Chloroform is a colorless liquid that is non-flammable. This chemical can be found in floor polishing substances and pesticides. Chloroform is recognized carcinogen, meaning it can cause cancer if one is exposed to it for a long period of time. It is ranked in the top 10% of the most hazardous compounds to human health and the environment, based on how toxic it is when ingested or inhaled, how it affects human health, cancer and noncancer risk scores through air and water, and how toxic it is to the environment. The overall hazard value of the chemical is 36, which puts it within the 100th percentile of other chemicals, making it in the top 10% of hazardous compounds. It can have the following negative health effects: Cardiovascular or Blood Toxicant, Developmental Toxicant, Endocrine Toxicant, Gastrointestinal or Liver Toxicant, Kidney Toxicant, Neurotoxicant, Reproductive Toxicant, Respiratory Toxicant. This means it can: cause blood diseases or abnormal heartbeat; affect the development of an unborn child; weaken the endocrine system leading to diabetes, hormone imbalances, reproductive disorders or cancer; liver damage and disease; cause kidney disease which can lead to cancer; affect how the nerves carry information through the bodies peripheral nervous system which weakens the lower half of the body causing a tingling sensation and loss of coordination; affect fertility and may even cause the loss of a fetus during pregnancy; cause respiratory damage which can lead to cancer.

=== Lead ===
Lead is found in substances such as rocks, coal, oil and gasoline. It is used in many everyday items such as batteries or medical devices. Lead is recognized as a carcinogen, meaning it can cause cancer if one is exposed to it for a long period of time. It is ranked in the top 10% of the most hazardous compounds to human health and the environment, based on how toxic it is when ingested or inhaled, how it affects human health, workers exposure to the chemical, cancer and noncancer risk scores through air and water, and how toxic it is to the environment. The overall hazard value of the chemical is 33, which puts it within the 100th percentile of other chemicals, making it in the top 10% of hazardous compounds. It can have the following negative health effects: Developmental Toxicant, Reproductive Toxicant, Cardiovascular or Blood Toxicant, Endocrine Toxicant, Gastrointestinal or Liver Toxicant, Immunotoxicant, Kidney Toxicant, Neurotoxicant, Respiratory Toxicant, Skin or Sense Organ Toxicant. This means it can affect the development of an unborn child; affect fertility and may even cause the loss of a fetus during pregnancy; cause blood diseases or abnormal heartbeat; weaken the endocrine system leading to diabetes, hormone imbalances, reproductive disorders or cancer; cause liver damage and disease; weaken the immune system which can lead to disease or cancer; cause kidney disease which can lead to cancer; affect how the nerves carry information through the bodies peripheral nervous system which weakens the lower half of the body causing a tingling sensation and loss of coordination; cause respiratory damage which can lead to cancer; cause hearing loss or other damage of the five senses.

=== Vinyl chloride ===
Vinyl chloride is also recognized as a carcinogen, meaning it can cause cancer if one is exposed to it for a long period of time. It is ranked in the top 10% of the most hazardous compounds to human health and the environment, based on how toxic it is when ingested or inhaled, how it affects human health, workers exposure to the chemical, cancer and noncancer risk scores through air and water, and how toxic it is to the environment. The overall hazard value of the chemical is 49, which puts it within the 100th percentile of other chemicals, making it in the top 10% of hazardous compounds. It is suspected to cause the following health hazards: Cardiovascular or Blood Toxicant, Developmental Toxicant, Gastrointestinal or Liver Toxicant, Neurotoxicant, Reproductive Toxicant, Respiratory Toxicant, Skin or Sense Organ Toxicant. This means it can: cause blood diseases or abnormal heartbeat; affect the development of an unborn child; liver damage and disease; affect how the nerves carry information through the bodies peripheral nervous system which weakens the lower half of the body causing a tingling sensation and loss of coordination; affect fertility and may even cause the loss of a fetus during pregnancy; cause respiratory damage which can lead to cancer; cause hearing loss or other damage of the five senses

== Cleanup ==
Price Landfill is currently in the process of being monitored by the USEPA, while the groundwater is still being treated, in hopes to eventually cap the landfill and to bring back wildlife. It has been in this process since the 1980s, when the USEPA first got involved in 1982. Originally the USEPA ran tests with the NJDEP and began to take steps in order to make it safe for people and stop the spread of the contamination as well as begin to rehabilitate the site.

=== Initial cleanup ===
After two years of the people around Price Landfill having found that their water was contaminated, the USEPA got involved. The agency provided a water alternative, such as bottled water, to around 37 of the affected neighbors of the Price Landfill site. The USEPA and the NJDEP conducted studies and collected samples of the soil and other substances at the site in order to find out how contaminated the area really was. To guarantee that the contamination did not spread to the Atlantic City (ACMUA) public water supply well field, the USEPA and the State of New Jersey began construction to connect to the New Jersey Water Company (NJWC) system, updated three wells of the ACMUA, set up filter systems and began to conserve water through a program.

=== Current status ===
Currently, the USEPA is monitoring the site four times a year and states that the migration of the groundwater and the exposure to nearby people is under control. The USEPA split their plan into three steps, as stated on their website: immediate actions, long-term actions (fixated on wells, and controlling the spreading of the contamination), and the general cleanup of the whole site.
