= Diamond Head Oil Refinery Superfund Site =

Contaminated site of former oil refinery in New Jersey

Coordinates: 40.7498°N 74.1354°W

The Diamond Head Oil Refinery is a former oil reprocessing facility located in Kearny, New Jersey, United States, that was designated as a Superfund site by the Environmental Protection Agency (EPA). It opened up in 1946, but then stopped production in 1979 and has been inactive since then. The refinery was shut down in 1980 and the EPA designated it as a Superfund site in 1991 due to the discovery of toxic chemicals in the soil and the surface water. This created a dangerous work environment for the workers at the facility. The EPA proposed a clean up plan for the site, but it has yet to take effect. So far, the Diamond Head site is still in the process of being cleaned up. Although cleanup plans were discussed and finalized, the future of the Diamond Head Oil Refinery and its cleanup state is unknown.

== Origins ==
A property purchased by Mayor William Sandford in 1668 became known as Kearny, New Jersey in 1867. The township held a copper mine and was responsible for helping create the steam engines. The township was named after General Phil Kearny of the United States military. The owner of the companies who were in charge of Diamond Head was Robert Mahler.

=== Town history ===
The township of Kearny, New Jersey was created in 1867. Mayor William Sandford obtained the property in 1668. It was then bought in 1701 by Sandford's friend, Mayor Nathaniel Kingsland, who then sold the land to Captain Arent Schuyler. Schuyler opened up a copper mine in the area, and was able to create the first steam engine in America. This steam engine allowed for a deeper mine shaft to be created. When the area became more populated in the nineteenth century, it was named Kearny after Major General Phil Kearny, a United States military officer who served in the Mexican–American War.

=== Company history ===
The Diamond Head Oil Refinery was run under multiple companies: PSC Resources, Inc., Ag-Met Oil Service, Inc., and Newtown Refining Corporation. Robert Mahler was the owner of all of these companies while Diamond Head was still active.

== Superfund designation ==
Diamond Head Oil Refinery became a Superfund site in 2002 after the state of New Jersey and the EPA decided that the site was too dangerous with chemicals. Both the state and the EPA performed their own investigative assessments on the site, researching the extent of the contamination along with the types of chemicals the site is contaminated with.

=== State involvement ===
The state of New Jersey issued a site assessment in May 2001 to investigate the extent of the damages and pollution at Diamond Head Oil Refinery. When they reported on the chemical exposure there, they said this: “According to the USEPA Expanded Site Inspection (December 1999), the environmental media at the site, including soils, sediments and groundwater, are contaminated. The contaminants include polychlorinated biphenyls (PCBs), pesticides, volatile organic compounds (VOCs), semiVOCs and heavy metals, and are present at levels of potential health concern. Environmental/ecological threats to surface water were also suggested. However, no known drinking water intakes are located in any surface waters within 15 miles downstream of the site. In addition, commercial fishing is prohibited in nearby surface waters (USEPA, 1991). Recreational fishing does not occur in the region of the site.”

=== EPA involvement ===
The EPA performed several phases of Remedial Investigation to identify what was wrong with the site and to identify the extent of the contamination. These were performed between 2003 and 2009. In 2009, a Feasibility Study was performed to discuss different clean up options for the waste at the site. In 2016, another Feasibility Study was performed to address the contaminants in the soil.

== Health and environmental hazards ==
The Diamond Head Oil Refinery has about three different kinds of dangerous chemicals polluting the area around it. All of these chemicals are dangerous for people to be exposed to since exposure to these chemicals can cause serious damage to people. The soil and surface waters around the site are heavily polluted by these chemicals. These chemicals polluting the site are what makes Diamond Head a Superfund site.

=== Polychlorinated biphenyls ===
One of the chemicals found at the site was PCB. PCB, or Polychlorinated biphenyls, are mixtures of colorless chemicals with no taste or smell. PCBs were originally produced to be used as insulation, coolants, and lubricants for a variety of electrical equipment. The production of PCBs was stopped in 1977 because it was suspected of certain harmful health and environmental effects. It is a dangerous chemical to humans and can cause damages to the liver if exposed to a large amount of it. Swallowing PCBs can result in coma or death.

=== Volatile organic compounds ===
Volatile organic compounds, or VOCs, are organic compounds that can easily become vapors or gases. These compounds are released from burning fuel and are also emitted from oil fields and diesel exhaust. Most compounds are hazardous air pollutants, so it is more common to be exposed by breathing in the air that is polluted. Some VOCs have no known health effects, while others can cause damage to the liver and nervous system.

== Clean up ==
The EPA came up with a plan to clean the Diamond Head Oil Refinery. However, that plan has not taken its effect. The site still remains untouched and the estimated date of cleanup is unknown.

=== Initial cleanup ===
In 2009, the EPA proposed a plan to excavate and remove 2 feet of contaminated soil and cover the rest of the contaminated soil with clean fill. 49,000 cubic feet of contaminated soil will be removed from the site, and the removal will cost $14 million.

=== Current status ===
Currently, the Diamond Head Oil Refinery has not been effectively cleaned up. The plan that was proposed has yet to go into effect, and the site remains inactive. There is no more information on when the plan to clean the site will take place.
