= Horseshoe Road Complex Superfund Site =

12-acre property located near the Raritan River

Horseshoe Road Complex
- Superfund site
- Location within Middlesex County, New Jersey Location within New Jersey
- Location: Sayreville, Middlesex, New Jersey; 40.4838°N 74.3222°W

Information
- CERCLIS ID: NJD980663678
- Contaminants: Methylene chloride, trichloroethylene (TCE), benzene, methoxychlor, tetrachlorethylene (PCE), and xylene
- Responsible parties: Various

Progress
- Proposed: May 10, 1993
- Listed: September 29, 1995
- Construction completed: July 25, 2022

The Horseshoe Road Complex Superfund Site in Sayreville, New Jersey is a 12 acres (4.9 ha) property located near the Raritan River. The industrial site has been out of operation since the early 1980s after a fire revealed 70 drums containing silver cyanide, ethyl acetate, and acetonitrile. The drums caught the attention of the Environmental Protection Agency (EPA) and by 1995 the Horseshoe Road Complex was on the National Priorities List. The site had three areas consisting of the Atlantic Development Corporation (ADC), Horseshoe Road Drum Dump, and Sayreville Pesticide Dump. The neighboring Atlantic Resources Corporation, the location for precious metal recovery, is addressed with the Horseshoe Road Complex (HRC) site due to the intermixing of chemical contamination. The on-site contamination is not an immediate threat to the surrounding community, although prolonged or repeated exposure to the site itself, will result in health effects. The HRC Superfund site is now in its final steps of cleanup in accordance to the EPA's plan.

== Origins ==
Sayreville, New Jersey is located in Middlesex County on the Raritan River, and near the Raritan Bay. As of the 2020 United States census, the Borough of Sayreville accommodates 45,345 residents in 16,851 households.

=== Town history ===
Sayreville was originally named roundabout after the riverbeds, until the 1860s when it was renamed after James R. Sayre. James R. Sayre was the co-founder of Sayre and Fisher Brick Company which was the first company to take advantage of Sayreville's substantial clay deposits. Sayreville was incorporated as a township up until 1919 when it was reincorporated as the Borough of Sayreville after a referendum was held on the matter. The Borough of Sayreville received scientific notice for their clay deposits as one of the world's major sources of museum-quality fossils.

=== Company history ===
The Atlantic Development Corporation facility on Horseshoe Road was leased by several companies from 1950 to the early 1980s, housing many operations including the production of sealants, roofing materials, polymers, and urethane. The facility consisted of several buildings, many which are demolished today due to structural safety hazards. The site contained incinerators as well, which were used for precious metals recovery during its years of operation.

== Superfund designation ==
Local and National intervention was involved in the recovery of the Horseshoe Road Complex site. Locally, the Edison Wetlands Association kept the community informed about the state of the Horseshoe Road Superfund site, the association also helped to advance the progress of assessing health risks that the site posed to the surrounding community. State intervention from the New Jersey Department of Health and Senior Services, partnered with the Agency for Toxic Substances and Disease Registry was required in order to evaluate the hazards remaining on site, and in the aquatic life near the site. Nationally, the EPA placed the site on the National Priorities List, and due to the efforts of the EPA, as well as local and statewide organizations, the final steps for recovery should be completed by the end of 2017.

=== State intervention ===
The Edison Wetlands Association (EWA) was the main local organization involved in recovery of the superfund site. In 1999 The EWA made a request for the Agency for Toxic Substances and Disease Registry (ATSDR) to evaluate the potential health threats posed by the site. The Edison Wetlands Association was primarily concerned with health threats presented to trespassers on the site, as well as the consumers of “blue crabs” which are found in the Raritan river adjacent to the site. Following the request of the EWA, the ATSDR and the New Jersey Department of Health and Senior Services (NJDHSS) evaluated the Horseshoe Road Complex (HRC) site in a health consultation on June 28, 2000. The ATSDR is “required by law to conduct a public health assessment at each of the sites on the EPA National Priorities List”.. With the data from the 1999 Remedial Investigation the ATSDR/NJDHSS completed two Health Consultations on the Horseshoe Road Complex site in 2000 and 2001 which found that it is unlikely that trespassers experience any adverse health effects upon exposure to the site; however, the Atlantic Resources facility (precious metals recovery operation) within the HRC site puts trespassers at risk to physical hazards. Regarding the “blue crabs”, 24 blue crab samples were collected from 11 locations including 12 crab muscle tissue samples, as well as 12 crab hepatopancreas (digestive gland) tissue samples. The EWA's effort to inform the surrounding community of the Horseshoe Road site was assisted with a Technical Assistance Grant (TAG) granted by the EPA.

=== National intervention ===
The Horseshoe Road Complex site was brought to the EPA's attention after over 70 drums of toxic waste were exposed following a brush fire in the early 1980s. The HRC site was recommended to placed on the National Priorities List (NPL) on September 29, 1995. In order for a site to be placed on the NPL it must evaluate the site based on the Hazard Ranking System (HRS). The HRS “is a numerically based screening system that uses information from initial, limited investigations to assess the relative potential of sites to pose a threat to human health or the environment”. The EPA considers sites receiving an HRS score of 28.5 and above eligible to be places on the NPL. Following the investigation of the Horseshoe Road Complex, the site was given HRS score of 51.37, qualifying the HRC site to be placed on the National Priorities List to begin clean-up.

== Health and environmental hazards ==
Several chemical hazards from the Atlantic Development Corporation, Horseshoe Road Drum Dump and the Sayreville Pesticide dump within the Horseshoe Road Complex were investigated and recorded in different layers of soil on site, as well as in the adjacent marsh and Raritan River. The “Blue Crabs” in the river, which are consumed by locals were investigated for possible health effects. Much of the findings concluded that the soil, sediments, and crabs were contaminated by the chemicals on the site.

=== Surface soil contamination ===
Upon investigation of the surface soil at the Horseshoe Road Complex site, Volatile organic compounds (VOCs), as well as semivolatile organic compounds (SVOCs), were discovered in shallow soil on the HRC site. VOCs are common air pollutants found in America. (“Volatile Organic Compounds”, 2017) The VOCs and SVOCs found on site included methylene chloride, trichloroethylene (TCE), benzene, methoxychlor, tetrachlorethylene (PCE), and xylene.

=== Subsurface soil contamination ===
The subsurface soil contamination was predominantly volatile organic compounds. Inorganic compounds such as arsenic and antimony were found at elevated levels of the subsurface soil.

=== Site-Wide groundwater contamination ===
Groundwater contamination on the Horseshoe Road Superfund site was found within the first 30 feet below ground surface. The contamination included high levels of inorganic compounds in monitoring wells on the Horseshoe Road site. The contamination of the groundwater was a result of plumes from both the Atlantic Development Corporation as well as the Atlantic Resources Corporation.

=== Raritan River surface water and sediment contamination ===
High concentrations of contaminants were found upriver of the drainageway that discharges surface runoff from the marsh adjacent to the Horseshoe Road site. Several water samples detected higher arsenic levels than the New Jersey surface water criteria.

== Cleanup ==
Due to the complexity of the hazards at the Horseshoe Road Complex (HRC) site the EPA created a cleanup plan organized into three operational units. The first operational unit is the demolition of the structurally unstable buildings remaining at the HRC site. The underground storage tanks were removed before the demolition. The demolition of the remaining structures at the HRC site was completed in 2003. Operational unit two addresses the removal of contaminated soil and groundwater and operational unit three is concerned with the River and marsh sediment. The Record of Decision planned for the River and marsh sediment cleanup to be started in 2006.

=== Initial cleanup ===
In regard to operational unit two, the EPA decided first on unearthing approximately 52,000 to 10,0000 cubic yards of deeper soils. The deeper soils were an active source of groundwater contamination on the HSR cite. The cleanup of soil and contaminated groundwater at the Horseshoe Road Complex site began February 2008 and was completed November 2009. The third operation unit addressing the contaminated sediments in the marsh and Raritan River began its progress in the summer of 2015. The dredging and capping in the Raritan River, as well as the marsh, was finished in 2016.

=== Current status ===
All final actions in restoring the marsh should be completed in 2017. The last phase of the Horseshoe Road site remediation addressing the Raritan river and marsh sediments was started in 2015, and is planned to be completed in 2017 as well.
