= A.O. Polymer Superfund Site =

Polluted site in New Jersey, U.S.

Coordinates: 41.047262°N 74.630511°W

A.O. Polymer
- Superfund site
- Location within Sussex County, New Jersey Location within New Jersey
- Location: Sparta, Sussex, New Jersey

Information
- CERCLIS ID: NJD030253355
- Contaminants: Tri- and Dichloroethane, butanone, acetone, benzene, and xylene among others
- Responsible parties: A.O. Polymer Corporation

Progress
- Proposed: December 30, 1982
- Listed: September 8, 1983
- Construction completed: May 8, 1998
- Partially deleted: August 26, 2002

The A.O. Polymer manufacturing site is located in Sparta Township, New Jersey. This facility created special polymers, plastics, and resins. It was also used for reclaiming spent solvents. The facility's poor waste handling led to serious contamination of the ground. It also contaminated the water in the ground with volatile organic compounds. The site has been a threat to the Allentown aquifer, which provides drinking water to over 5,000 people. Initial clean ups started with getting rid of old drums and contaminants from their original disposal area. The company took them and decided to dispose of them elsewhere, thus not fixing the problem. Primary cleanups of the site were ongoing as of 2008. The EPA (Environmental Protection Agency) has been using water pumps to remove contaminants from the water in the ground. A soil extraction system has been put at their disposal to remove harmful contamination within the soil as well. All wells in the affected areas have been closed.

== Origins ==
The town of Sparta, New Jersey, was a small settlement dating back to the Native Americans. It was later established as a full township in 1845 and was popular for its role in the mining industry for decades. The township is home to the A.O. Polymer Corporation, which was a resin production facility that dumped liquid hazardous wastes into nearby disposal sites. This led to the contamination of groundwater and soil, affecting wells that provide drinking water to Sparta and nearby towns that received water from the Allentown Aquifer.

=== Town history ===
Sparta was established as a township in New Jersey in April 1845 after being a settlement for years prior. The land was settled by the Dutch who met the Lenape Native Americans. It used to be big in the mining industry, being popular for iron, limestone and zinc over the course of a century. The population has grown by thousands each decade since establishment. It's located in the Highlands region of New Jersey in Sussex County. Sparta is known for a large number of pilots living there or in the vicinity of the town. It is a home for countless small businesses such as pizzerias and other eateries; these provide a stable economy for the community.

=== Company history ===
A.O. Polymer Corporation is a facility that produced various resins, plastics, solvents, polymers and other artificial materials. The company had operated in Sparta Township from the early 1960s all the way to 1994, according to official EPA documentation. A.O. Polymer was found to have poor habits of waste handling from their factory and they poured liquid wastes into their disposal pits. The dump site that the company had used had contaminants seep into the soil and all the way into the groundwater which affected water wells in Sparta. This became apparent in the 1970s and on September 1, 1983, the site was placed on the National Priorities List.

== Superfund designation ==
The state intervened, and its handling of the disposal was immensely inadequate. As a result of this, the EPA stepped in to properly take control of the situation. They took immediate actions to better the site and rid it of contaminations. They removed tons of waste and contaminated materials from the early 1980s to the early 2000s.

=== State intervention ===
In 1981 the New Jersey Department of Environmental Protection had removed the contents of A.O. Polymer's disposal pits and disposed of them elsewhere. They removed roughly 3,100 tons of contaminated soil and around 900 drums from the disposal site. The NJDEP just moved the problem to a new location rather than fixing it. The state's inadequate handling in response to the contamination prompted intervention from the EPA.

=== National intervention ===
The EPA moved in to begin short-term removal processes in 1982. The EPA took immediate action by addressing the health threats that the hazardous waste left in the abandoned sites. They then removed 34,000 pounds of hazardous waste and 37,600 pounds of non-hazardous waste from the site, as well as hazardous fluids and materials containing asbestos. In September 1983, the site was listed in the National Priorities list by the EPA. Long-term removal actions consisted of using a soil vapor extraction system which was activated in 1995 and is still in use. This helped to clean up over 345 million gallons of contaminated water from the ground. The EPA pushed to further clean up the site after the owner abandoned it in 1994.

== Health and environmental hazards ==
The contaminants dumped by A.O. Polymer affected water in the ground as well as the soil under the disposal pits. This contaminated water for Sparta and surrounding communities.

=== Contaminated groundwater ===
The hazardous waste dumped by A.O. Polymer initially contaminated soil and groundwater. The contamination of the water led to the contamination of the Allentown Aquifer, including the wells in and around Sparta Township. This led to the site becoming a problem for more than just Sparta, but for the surrounding area too. The EPA was able to get this under control by stabilizing contaminated groundwater using a groundwater treatment system. There is no longer any hazardous discharge to surface water as of 2008.

=== Soil contamination ===
In the summer of 1993, a large soil gas investigation was carried out. These proved volatile organic contaminants were present beneath the ground of dump sites. This was not a great concern because it did not threaten any life above ground, but it goes to show the extent of the contamination.

== Cleanup ==
The EPA stepped in to clean up the A.O. Polymer site as quick as possible after the NJDEP failed to do so. They removed a majority of the contaminants and set up systems to clean the soil and groundwater for the future. Progress reports on the site have closed and the site was sold for redevelopment.

=== Initial cleanup ===
The state's only attempt to clean up the site was taking the waste and putting somewhere else, thus not fixing the problem. The EPA intervened in 1982 and removed 34,000 pounds (15,000 kg) of hazardous waste, 37,600 pounds (17,100 kg) of non-hazardous waste, 91 cubic yards (70 m^{3}) of materials with asbestos, 121 cubic yards (93 m^{3}) of contaminated soil, and 3,491 US gallons (13,210 L) of hazardous liquids. Also, a soil evaporation system was placed in 1995 and has been removing contaminants from the soil beneath the waste pits since 1995. A groundwater treatment system decontaminated nearly 350 million US gal (1.3 billion L) of groundwater since 1998.

=== Current status ===
After being on the National Priorities List for 17 years, the EPA removed the facility part of the site from the list in 2000, but the site as a whole is still there. Most reports on the site have closed since 2008 with the latest being in 2013. The former A.O. Polymer site was sold privately in 2009 to undergo reconstruction. As of September 2017, the site has still not achieved readiness for reuse and redevelopment.
