= Rockaway Borough Well Field Superfund Site =

Site heavily contaminated with hazardous materials in Rockaway, New Jersey

Coordinates: 40.902°N 74.508°W

The Rockaway Borough Well Field is a Superfund site that came into place in 1981 after the soil was suspected of being contaminated with toxic chemicals. The site is located in Rockaway, Morris County, New Jersey. It was first found to be an official Superfund site after it was discovered that tetrachloroethene (PCE) and trichloroethylene (TCE) were contaminating the soil. Studies suspected that the chemicals were coming from the area of two companies in the town of Rockaway. In 1985, the residents of Rockaway were advised not to drink the tap water and the National Guard had to come and supply water supplies for the community. The town soon installed a water filter system in order to try to reduce the amount of pollution in the water. After finding that the system was not effective, the NJDEP (New Jersey Department of Environmental Protection) came to the scene to investigate the soil. NJDEP found that the soil tested positive with chemicals and from there the EPA were contacted. The EPA found chemicals in different areas of the borough and found that the soil was contaminated and began to install a groundwater treatment system that functioned to purify the ground of chemicals. The system was soon pumping up to 900,000 gallons of water from the boroughs wells. Today, the pump is still functioning and has since reduced the amount of chemicals and the chance of pollution in the water to appear again. The final project to completely purify the water is still in production.

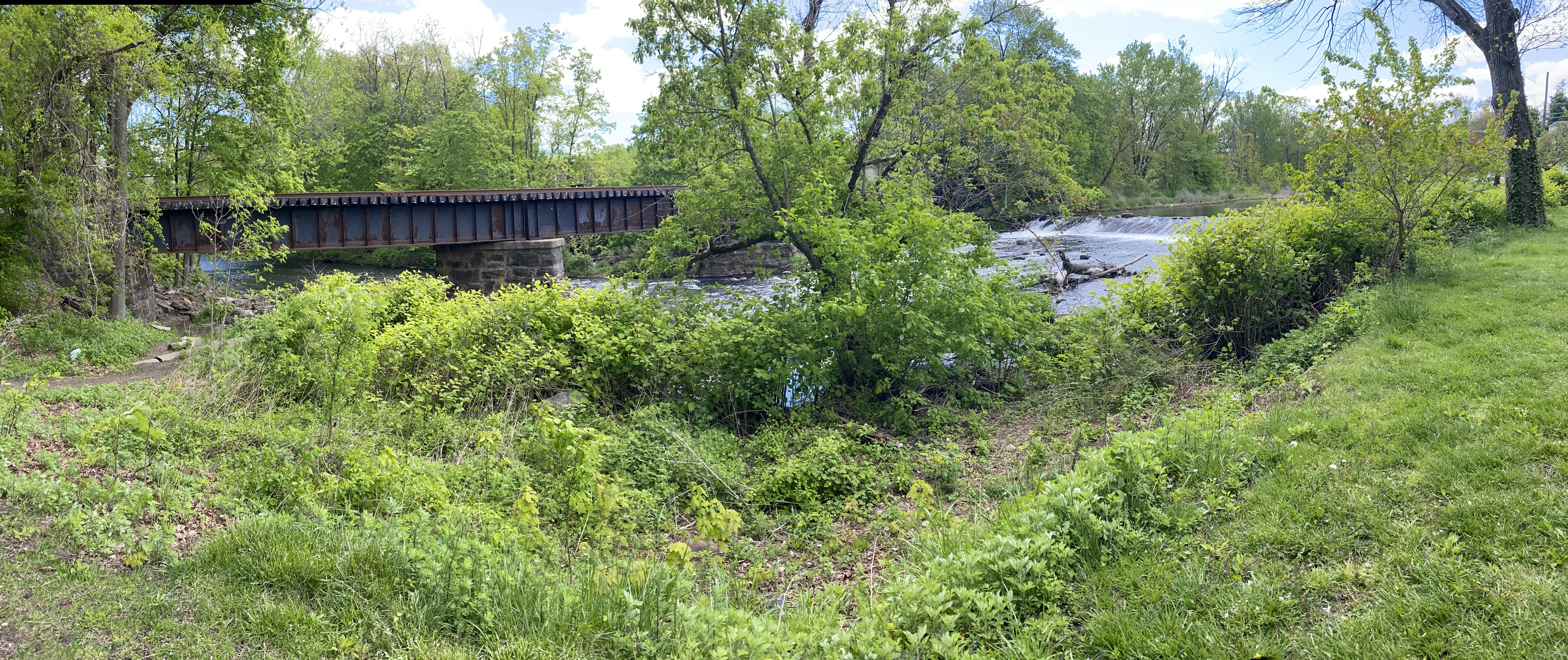
to the left of the bridge is the center of the superfund site

== Origin ==
=== Town history ===
The town of Rockaway is located in Morris County, New Jersey. It is located in the 11th Congressional District and part of New Jerseys 25th state legislative district. Rockaway is about 2.072 square miles of land and 0.47 square miles of water. The mayor currently is Russell Greuter and Rockaway is populated with close to 6,500 residents. The town was first established in 1730 and was later named Rockaway Borough. The town quickly became a main center for vendors, retailers, and traders. The main street in Rockaway soon was filled with different stores and businesses.

=== Company history ===
Klockner & Klockner (K&K) is a real estate holding company that was founded by Daniel Klockner Jr, in the 1950s when several industrial buildings were constructed. K&K is local to Rockaway, NJ. Properties owned by Klockner & Klockner were occupied by numerous tenants since the buildings were constructed. K&K never occupied any of the properties.

Another company that opened in the same area was Lusardi's Cleaners Inc. which is a small dry cleaners.

When tests on the soil came into action, many signs pointed toward properties owned by these companies for being responsible based on the locations of the companies.

== Superfund designation ==
In 1981, the town of Rockaway was restricted to using their drinking water due to warnings of contaminants in the water. The National Guard was contacted to help provide water supplies for the residents until the town installed a water treatment system to attempt to clean out the contaminants from the water.

=== State intervention ===
The NJDEP (New Jersey Department of Environmental Production), in 1985, performed tests on the soil and water and found that the contaminants were coming from different areas of the Borough. The NJDEP kept improving the water treatment system until the EPA were contacted after the site made the EPA's National Priorities.

=== National intervention ===
The EPA began performing tests and investigating the soil and found high traces of perchloroethylene (tetrachloroethylene/PCE), trichloroethylene (TCE), lead, and chromium. After finding these chemicals in the water, the EPA installed their own groundwater treatment system in effort to purify the water more thoroughly than NJDEP's.

== Health and environmental hazards ==
The EPA's investigation on the Rockaway Borough Well field Superfund site found high traces of trichloroethylene, perchloroethylene, lead, and chromium. These chemicals can cause long term damage and can result in lethal illnesses.

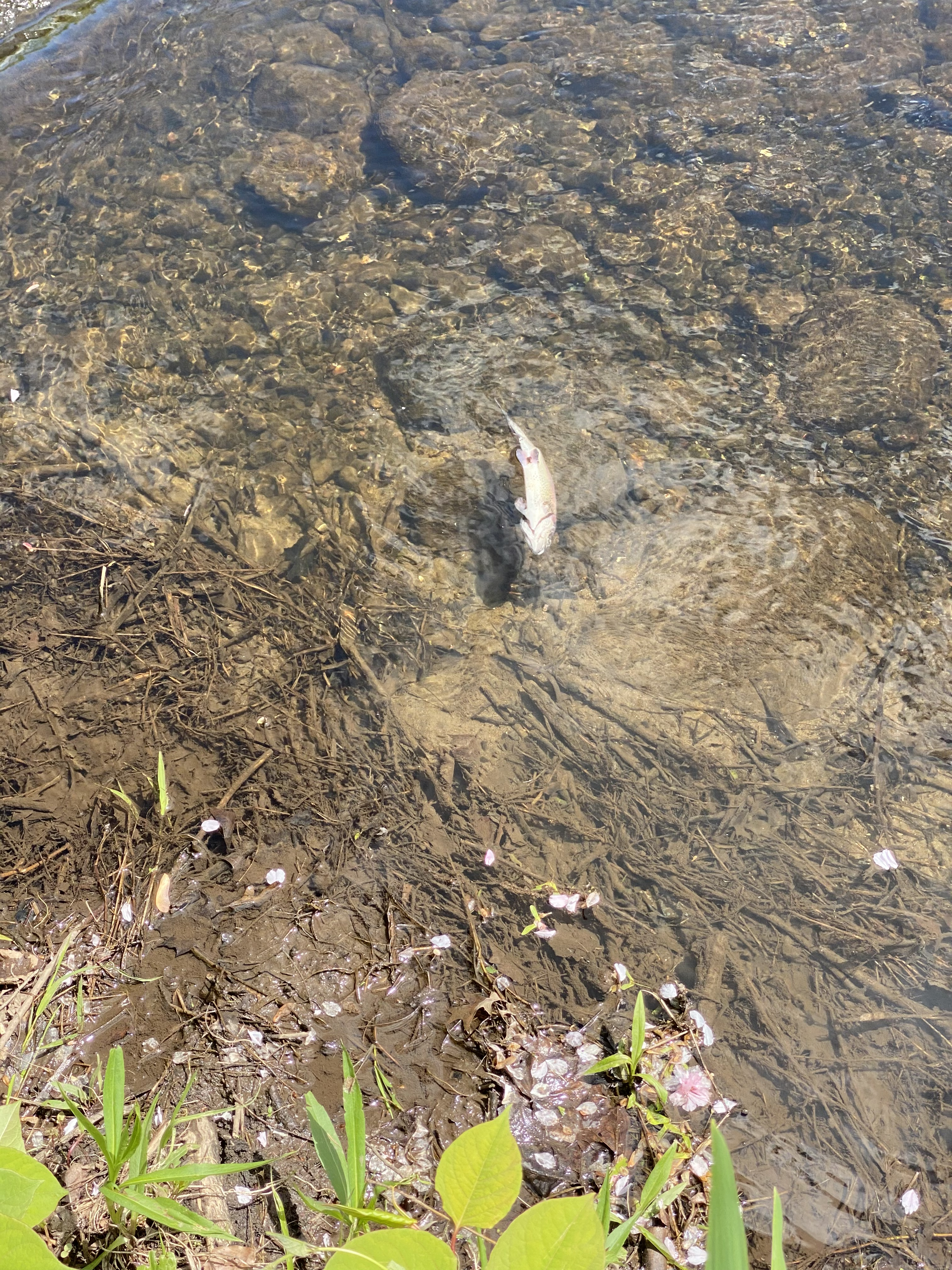
Dead fish near the site of the Rockaway Borough Well Field Superfund Site

Trichloroethylene (TCE) is a non-flammable halocarbon that is used as an industrial solvent to remove grease from metal. Exposure to TCE can cause problems in the liver, immune system, kidneys, and the central nervous system.

Perchloroethylene (PCE) is a chemical that can be found in industrial solvents and also in dry cleaning fabrics. Exposure can be caused if using dry cleaning products, shoe polish, wood cleaners and other products. High levels of exposure to PCE can cause damage to the central nervousness and can lead to a coma with a lethal outcome.

Lead is a grayish metal that can be found in the ground or in clusters of rock in the earth. Lead is used in products including batteries, pipes, metal parts, and many more. Lead is used in some utensils and cosmetic products which can lead to exposure. Short term effects are headaches, trouble sleeping, high blood pressure, and can cause irritation to the eyes, nose, and throat.

Chromium is an element that is found in many natural resources and is used in many dyes and pigments. Chromium can be found naturally in some foods like vegetables, meats, and fruits. Consumption of chromium can cause kidney damage, liver damage, increased chances of lung cancer, and ulcers.

== Cleanup ==
The town of Rockaway Borough’s initial action to the contamination of the water in 1981 was to install a carbon water treatment system to get rid of the pollution in the water. In 1986, further studies proceeded to improve the process of purification and investigations soon found that the pollution was coming from two spots in the borough. The goal was to install extraction wells in both of the locations and to start purifying the water to the point where it can be put back and be available for consumption. Then keep the water thoroughly monitored in order to make sure it stays pure and clear of pollution. The process to get these systems installed into the two locations began in 1991. Currently the water treatment system has reduced the amount of pollution in the water enormously. Currently the process of the last project to purity the whole area and open it back up to the public is still in production.

== See also ==
- Superfund
- Environmental remediation
- Groundwater pollution
- Soil contamination
- Water pollution
- Water treatment
- National Priorities List
