= White Chemical Corporation Superfund Site =

Coordinates: 40.698164°N 74.197904°W

White Chemical Corporation
- Superfund site
- Location within Essex County, New Jersey Location within New Jersey
- Location: Newark, Essex, New Jersey

Information
- CERCLIS ID: NJD980755623
- Contaminants: Trichloroethane, acetone, acrolein, ammonium hydroxide, styrene, sulfuric acid, among others
- Responsible parties: White Chemical Corporation

Progress
- Proposed: May 9, 1991
- Listed: September 25, 1991

The White Chemical Corporation Superfund site is 4.4 acres of contaminated industrial land in Newark, New Jersey, about a half mile away from Newark Airport. The Newark site operated from 1983 to July 1990, selling small amounts of chemicals. Some of the chemicals sold there were Trichloroethylene and 1-2-Dichloroethane. These chemicals were being improperly stored and leaked into the soil and groundwater. The EPA placed the property on the National Priorities List (NPL) in 1991, declaring it a Superfund site.

== Origins ==
The White Chemical Corporation Superfund site is a 4.4-acre vacant lot located at 660 Frelinghuysen Avenue in Newark, New Jersey.

== Health hazard ==
Chemicals were improperly stored on-site in containers that were leaking into soil and groundwater. Some of these chemicals, such as Trichloroethylene, are carcinogenic. Another chemical identified at the site was 1-2-Dichloroethane, which is a probable carcinogenic in humans.

== Superfund designation ==
The EPA found over 10,000 55-gallon drums as well as other containers that were improperly storing hazardous materials. The storage containers were degrading, leaking or fuming their contents into the surrounding environment. The EPA also found 150 gas cylinders, 126 storage tanks, and additional containers on-site. In addition to the improperly stored materials in drums, there were approximately 12,000 laboratory-sized containers being used to improperly store materials on-site. The carcinogenic substances that were stored in the containers were found in the soil and groundwater of Newark. The discovery of these improperly stored hazardous substances led to the site being declared a Superfund site.

== Cleanup ==
Immediately after discovery of the improper containers, the EPA and state of New Jersey began a surface contamination cleanup where they removed over 1,000 contaminated drums, vats, tanks, laboratory-size containers and other vessels from 1990 to April 1993. Next, the EPA began the demolition of on-site buildings and the remediation of on-site soil. The EPA dug out and disposed of 21,000 cubic yards of contaminated soil and demolished every building by April 2009. They filled the vacant soil plot with new fresh soil and the land was regraded. The last phase of cleanup (groundwater contamination) seems to be the most difficult. It would be easy for the EPA to simply dig out the contaminated groundwater and treat it as is. This method of cleanup is as EPA official Elias Rodriguez states “not technically feasible...because of the complex rock formations underlying the site.” He states that the EPA has come to the conclusion that “the plan requires bioremediation, the injection of chemicals into the groundwater to promote the breakdown of the pollutants”.

Once the bioremedy is in effect, the EPA approximates the groundwater will receive several rounds of chemical injections throughout the course of years to ensure the water is treated properly. Monitoring wells will also be constructed to take samples of the groundwater and prove that it is no longer contaminated. Currently, the site is awaiting funding from the EPA so it can begin bioremediation.
