= Sharkey Landfill =

Landfill site in New Jersey, United States

- Superfund site
- Location within Morris County, New Jersey Location within New Jersey
- Location: Parsippany, Morris, New Jersey; 40°50′52″N 74°20′53″W

Information
- CERCLIS ID: NJD980505762
- Contaminants: 2-Methylnaphthalene, butanone, acetone, polychlorinated biphenyl, barium, cadmium, Chlorobenzene, chromium, cyanide
- Responsible parties: Ciba-Geigy

Progress
- Proposed: December 30, 1982
- Listed: September 8, 1983
- Construction completed: March 9, 2004

Sharkey Landfill is a 90-acre property located in New Jersey along the Rockaway and Whippany rivers in Parsippany, New Jersey. Landfill operations began in 1945, and continued until September 1972, when large amounts of toluene, benzene, chloroform, dichloroethylene, and methylene chloride were found, all of which have are a hazard to human health causing cancer and organ failure. Sharkey Landfill was put on the National Priority List (or NPL) in 1983, and clean up operations ran until the site was deemed as not a threat in 2004.

== Origins ==
Colonization of Parsippany dates all the way back to 1700, starting as a collection of English settlers to a large city of about 53,000 people. Ciba-Geigy, founded in the 1970s, made plants all over the east coast, placing one in what is now the bustling city of Parsippany.

=== Town history ===
The area of Parsippany was part of the glacier until 13,000 BCE. Native Americans had settled the area first 12,500 years ago after all the thawing and drainage of water, but consistent wars let to the area being under English colony control from 1700 onward.

As of 2010, there is a mostly diverse population of 53,238 people. The local government follows the standard Mayor-Council system, having a standard one mayor and five councilmen. Since 2018, the mayor has been Democrat Michael A. Soriano.

=== Company history ===
While originally two different Swiss pharmaceutical companies up to this point, Ciba-Geigy Corp(Or Ciba-Geigy Ltd.) was founded in 1971 off of the merge of companies CIBA and Geigy. After the merge, Geigy workers moved to the CIBA headquarters in Ardsley, New York. In 1992, Ciba-Geigy was convicted of illegal waste dumping against the state of New Jersey.

== Superfund designation ==
There was no state intervention other than a court case against Ciba-Geigy, the company mainly responsible. The EPA started clean up in September 1983, after the site was placed on the National Priority List(NPL).

=== State intervention ===
State intervention was small due to the EPA being a federal department. New Jersey did help reorganize the site in 1979 for the expansion of the Parsippany Sewage Treatment Plant, but nothing else was done except a court case which was argued on September 17 of 1991 and was decided against Ciba-Geigy with a $62 million fine.

=== National intervention ===
The EPA conducted many groundwater tests before putting Sharkey Landfill on the NPL on September 8, 1983. The Record of Decision(ROD) called for standard clean up procedure.

== Health and environmental hazards ==
Due to the amount of time Sharkey Landfill was used as a landfill, tons of dangerous chemicals were discovered throughout the area. Large amounts of carcinogenic compounds such as benzene, chloroform, and methylene chloride were found within the site, along with other dangerous and volatile chemicals such as toluene and dichloroethylene were also found. While most of these chemicals did not pose any major hazards to the environment, many pose large threats to the health and safety of humans.

=== Hazard 1: toluene ===
==== Sources ====
One of the most abundant chemicals found at Sharkey Landfill was toluene (about 560,000 pounds), a hydrocarbon with the chemical formula C_{7}H_{8}. Toluene forms naturally within crude oil, and is used not only as a cleaning solution, but is also used in my other industrial products such as; medicine, wall and spray paints, paint thinner, dyes, explosives, fingernail polish, spot removers, lacquers, adhesives, rubber, detergents, antifreeze, and also in some printing and leather tanning processes. Toluene’s most abundant use is in the production of benzene, another chemical found at the site.

==== Human hazard ====
Toluene is also one of the more dangerous chemicals found at the landfill. Exposure to Toluene in even limited amounts can cause damage to the immune system, along with extreme sickness and dizziness, which can lead to things like nausea and confusion. On a more moderate to extreme scale, large amounts of exposure can cause things like liver, kidney and heart failure, along with moderate to extreme amounts of brain damage. Toluene also has the risk of damaging the fetus of a pregnant woman if she were to be exposed to the chemical.

==== Environmental damage ====
Toluene is also a Volatile Organic Compound(VOC), which gives it the added danger of creating a toxic smog if it reacts with enough sunlight and moisture in the environment. Toluene is also flammable in its liquid and gaseous state, which in high amounts can be very dangerous if the area is known for fires and/or high levels of humidity.

=== Hazard 2: benzene ===
==== Sources ====
Another one of the more dangerous and abundant chemicals found at the site was 130,000 pounds of Benzene, another VOC with the chemical formula C6H6. Benzene can be produced both organically and inorganically, coming from things such as forest fires, volcanoes, and is also a natural part of crude oil. But, benzene can also come from human creations such as gasoline, diesel exhaust, and more commonly, cigarette smoke. Benzene is one of the most common chemicals used within the US, used by combining it with many other chemicals to form things such as; plastics, resins, nylon, synthetic fibers, explosives, photographic chemicals, rubber, lubricants, dyes, adhesives, coatings, paint, detergents, drugs, pesticides, printing, lithography, food processing, it has been used as a solvent, and up until the 1990s when use was greatly limited, was used as a very popular gasoline additive.

==== Human hazard ====
Benzene is the most dangerous chemical on this list, as while it does not have that many health effects, the things that it can cause are the most lethal. While small doses of benzene are of no harm, as they can be found on many everyday food items, even the shortest exposure(through breathing or eating) to high amounts of benzene can lead to extreme cases of nausea, dizziness/tiredness, and can cause damage to the central nervous system, leading to things like paralysis, coma or death. Benzene is also a known carcinogen, and can cause things like anemia, leukemia, and if in contact with eyes, can cause blindness.

==== Environmental damage ====
As for environmental damage, benzene is very similar to toluene in that it is a VOC, and can cause poisonous smog if in contact with high amounts of light and moisture, and is also a flammable liquid which is very dangerous for areas known for forest fires.

=== Hazard 3: chloroform ===
==== Sources ====
Chloroform was one other chemical found in abundance on the site, with about 40,000 pounds found throughout the landfill. Chloroform is a cleaning solvent, one of many that can be used for things such as; cleaning electronics, tools, engines, and automotive parts; dissolving oil, paint, and grease; to mix/thin paint, glue, pigments, epoxy resins, and pesticides; and to create other similar solvents or chemicals.

==== Human hazard ====
While chloroform has no known environmental hazards, large amounts of exposure to chloroform can cause alterations in the mind, such as depression and irritability. Larger amounts of exposure can cause other diseases such as Hepatitis and Jaundice. Chloroform is also anticipated to be a human carcinogen.

=== Hazard 4: methylene chloride ===
==== Sources ====
Similar to chloroform, methylene chloride is a solvent, with the chemical formula CH_{2}Cl_{2}. It can be found in all similar compounds as chloroform but can cause a lot more damage to the body than the former.

==== Human hazard ====
Regular exposure to something such as methylene chloride can cause dangerous amounts of damage to the kidneys, liver, lungs, and if exposed long enough, the central nervous system, which can cause things like hearing loss, mental illness, and short or long-term memory loss. Even small exposure instances can cause things like irritated body parts, dizziness/nausea, drunkenness, and shortness of breath.

=== Hazard 5: dichloroethylene ===
About 3,000 pounds of dichloroethylene, chemical formula C_{2}H_{4}Cl_{2}, were also found within the waste of Sharkey Landfill. Dichloroethylene poses no major environmental damage, but animals and humans alike can be exposed through either breathing, eating, or contact with the skin. While the amount of exposure can change the severity of the damage to death-inducing, the only known health hazard of dichloroethylene is damage to the liver and lungs within animals and humans.

== Clean up ==
Initial clean up of Sharkey Landfill began with a standard 5 part plan. This continued until 1993 when progress was made and so the cleaning had to not be AS severe. As of 2004, construction was no longer needed. Site sampling continues to this day.

=== Initial clean up ===
Standard clean up goes as follows; 1. Capping of the landfill with a clay-like membrane under a large layer of dirt to deter the movement of the waste due to rain and snow runoff and to also promote vegetation growth. 2. The creation of vents within the membrane to ensure there is no buildup of gases such as methane. 3. Controls of surface water to specifically handle storm and rain runoff, along with controls over river erosion of the site. 4. Standard security fence placement to ensure the safety of people and animals from being harmed by the contamination. And 5. A long-term program meant to handle the monitoring of nearby groundwater to test if the clean-up process is actually working.

=== Current status ===
As of March 9, 2004, the EPA issued a Superfund Preliminary Site Close Out, stating no construction is needed further. Sampling still continues.

== See also ==
- Novartis
