= Maywood Superfund site =

Superfund site in Maywood/Rochelle Park, New Jersey, U.S.

Coordinates: 40.9553°N 74.0791°W

The Maywood Chemical Company processed radioactive thorium waste from 1916 through 1955 in Maywood / Rochelle Park, in Bergen County, New Jersey, United States. The United States Environmental Protection Agency (EPA) deemed Maywood Chemical a Superfund site in 1983 and has since been in the clean process.

== Origins ==
Maywood was established as a borough in 1894. Stepan Company purchased Maywood works in 1959 and renamed it Maywood Chemical Company. Maywood became a Superfund location in 1983 after radioactive thorium waste was processed through the borough.

=== Town history ===
Maywood was established as a borough on June 29, 1894. Maywood borders Hackensack, Lodi, Rochelle Park, and Paramus. Maywood is a mid-class community that features about 9,555 people living in community, the census is made up of about 74% white, 5% Black or African American, 10% Asian, and 6% other.

=== Company history ===
Maywood Chemical Company was involved in the creation of the Superfund site. This was mainly because of act of processing radioactive thorium waste from 1916 through 1955. Maywood Chemical was formerly known as Maywood Works before it was purchased by Stepan Company in 1955.

== Superfund designation ==
Maywood Chemical Company was designated as a Superfund site in 1983. Since the designation, there has been state intervention which has involved community members filing a lawsuit against Stepan Company in 1997. National intervention has involved the U.S. Army Corps of Engineers, who helped with cleanup.

=== State intervention ===
548 residents filed a lawsuit against Stepan Company in 1997 claiming that the operations of Maywood Chemical Works caused health problems that involved cancer and deficit disorder. The Lawsuit was filed after a study from the New Jersey Department of Health showed that the rate of brain and nervous system cancer was twice the national average. The lawsuit was settled in 1999.

=== National intervention ===
The U.S. Army Corps of Engineers has stepped in to help Maywood Chemical Company with the cleanup of the chemical waste within the Superfund site and is responsible of the Formerly Utilized Sites Remedial Action (FUSRAP) contaminants which relates to all contaminations on the property, which is thorium. Stepan Company is responsible for all non-FUSRAP contamination, which is radiological soil cleanup.

== Health and environmental hazards ==
The health and environmental hazards of radioactive thorium consists of effects in plant growth and dangers to humans and animals that involves cancers and disorders when exposed to thorium for periods of time.

=== Dangers to humans ===
Some effects to humans and animals consists of nausea, vomiting, diarrhea, fever, and cancer. If inhaled, the thorium may stay in the lungs for an extensive period of time. All left over thorium in the body will be inserted into the bloodstream and then placed in the bones. This can cause lung and bone cancer.

=== Dangers to environment ===
The effects are not as harmful to the environment. Effects are only expected to occur when there are large amounts of exposure. When effected, thorium can be found in soil, rocks, water, and air, which then become hazardous to the area.

== Cleanup ==
Maywood Chemical Company is currently in the cleanup stage and being cleaned by two entities, the U.S. Army Corps and Stepan Company. Cleanup includes the removal of soils contaminated with pollutants such as radioactive thorium

=== Initial cleanup ===
The initial cleanup consisted of testing in 1980-1983 from the State, EPA, and the Department of Energy (DOE). Testing revealed that there were low levels of contamination at several locations. The site was then assigned to the DOE in 1984. The removal of soil was immediately started.

=== Current status ===
Maywood Chemical is still currently listed as a Superfund site. The USACE and Stepan Company are currently working to clean the site. The ongoing cleanup process involves soil cleanup work, removal and disposal of contaminated materials, and restricted land use.
