= Mangel =

Mangel or Mangels may refer to:

== People ==
- Mangel (footballer), full name Miguel Ángel Prendes Pérez, Spanish footballer
- Mangel (surname), includes a list of people with the surname
- Mangels (surname), includes a list of people with the surname

== Other uses ==
- Mangel, a fictional English town in Charlie Williams's Mangel Trilogy
- Mangel, a defunct clothing store and former owner of Shoppers Fair stores
- Mangel, Nigeria, a Tiv village in Benue State

== See also ==
- Mangal (disambiguation)
- Mangels-Illions Carousel, a carousel at the Columbus Zoo and Aquarium
- Mangelwurzel, or mangel beet, a root vegetable, used as animal fodder, member of the Beta vulgaris family
- Mangle (disambiguation)
