= Bydgoszcz Tool Factory "BEFANA" =

Polish tool manufacturing company based in Bydgoszcz founded in the 19th century

Coordinates: 53°05′46″N 18°03′58″E

Befana
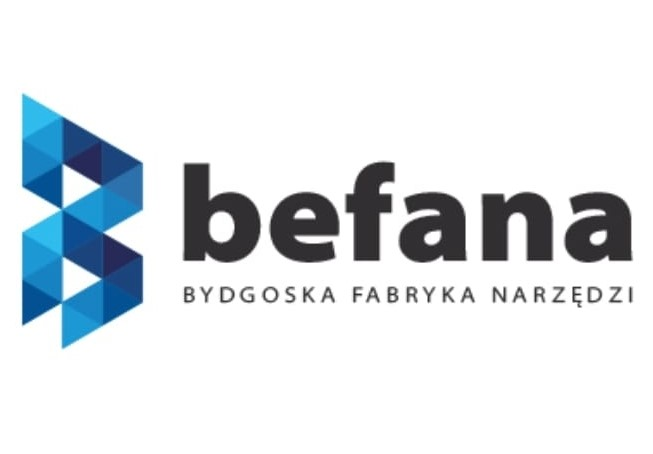
- Native name: Bydgoska Fabryka Narzędzi „Befana” Sp. z o.o.
- Company type: Private limited company
- Industry: Metalworking
- Predecessor: Leopold Zobel's Steam Machine and Boiler Factory
- Founded: 1852; 173 years ago
- Founder: Leopold Zobel
- Headquarters: Bydgoszcz, Poland
- Products: Metal hand tools, precision files and cutters
- Website: www.befana.com.pl

Befana is a Polish company that manufactures metal hand tools, precision files and cutters that is based in the city of Bydgoszcz. The company was established in 1852 and is one of the oldest firms in Bydgoszcz with a long history of manufacturing.

== History ==
=== Prussian period ===
The origins of the factory date back to the establishment in 1852 of a craftsman's workshop producing mangles and laundry ironers. After a first owner change, the workshop turned to regenerating used files, converting the place 3 years later into a relatively large plant.

Between 1885 and 1915, the factory moved to then "An der Stadtschleuse" (today's 8 Marcinkowskiego Street), under the name Leopold Zobel Steam Machine and Boiler Factory (German: Maschinen- und Dampfkesselfabrik von L. Zobel, Bromberg); Zobel was a master locksmith who came to Bydgoszcz in 1879. The plant, designed by architect Paul Böhm, was producing steam boilers and steam locomotives for narrow-gauge railways, ship machines and accessories. In 1895, the factory was awarded meritorious medals at exhibitions in Poznań and Królewiec for the quality of manufactured products.

In 1910, instead of regenerating files, a production of files was launched, managed by the company Gustav Granobs - Fabryka Filników i Narzędzi (File and Tool Factory) which in 1915 was merged into the firm Granobs i Kozłowski. The production then expanded to various tools in addition to the original file item (e.g. shovels, pickaxes and axes). In this context, the production plant expanded in Marcinkowskiego street, taking over nearby liquidated L. Zobel's shipyards. Its workforce then reached 50 people.

At the end of the Prussian period, Granobs i Kozłowski was one of the few firm in Bydgoszcz owned by Polish capital.

=== Interwar period ===
Under the Second Polish Republic, the plant operated under the name "Granobs i Kozłowski" Bydgoszcz File and Tool Factory Limited liability company - warehouse of steel, screws, tools and machine tools (Polish: Bydgoska Fabryka Pilników i Narzędzi „Granobs i Kozłowski” Tow. z ograniczoną poręką – skład stali, śrub, narzędzi i narzędzi maszynowych). Employment then reached 100 people under the management of director Hugon Kozłowski.

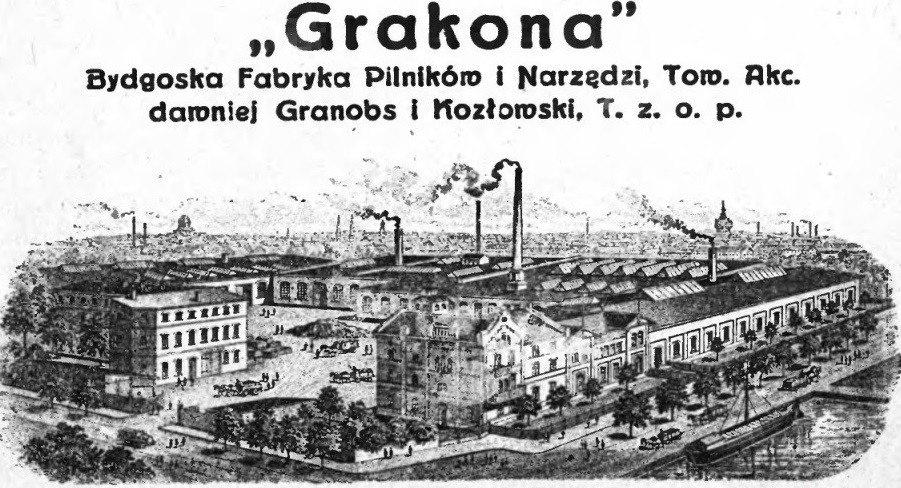
The factory on Marcinkowskiego Street

In July 1923, Erich Granobs, Gustaw's legal successor, left the company capital and the business was transformed into "GRAKONA" Joint Stock Company (GRA for Granobs and KO for Kozłowski). In 1925, Grakona opened a bankruptcy proceeding: shareholder Onufry Gertner was appointed as a member of the management board.

Revitalised, with a new capital, the company expanded. At the end of the 1920s, it became the largest file factory in Poland with 200 employees and was awarded with domestic and foreign medals (e.g. Paris (1927), Rome (1927) and Polish General Exhibition in Poznań (1929). "Grakona" tools were used by almost all factories in Poland and were as well exported to many countries. Furthermore, production was not limited to files, but enlarged to a panel of forged tools (pincers, hammers...) for the growing needs of agriculture. Thanks to the high quality of its products, the firm registered its brand name. Until 1934, it operated under the name "Grakona" - Onufry Gertner i Spółka Fabryka Pilników i Narzędzi Sp. z o. o. (English: Grakona – Onufry Gertner and company Files and Tools Factory).

From 1935 to the outbreak of World War II, the company ran as Zygmunta Mielżyńskiego-Kornatowskiego „Prom”, with 300 workers. In particular, part of the production was assigned to the Polish State Railways and also the French-Polish Rail Association which had its seat in Bydgoszcz.

=== German occupation ===
During German occupation, the factory operated with a basic output as Georg Stehr Tools and Machines Factory and employed up to 1000 people.

Base tools for cars and aviation were delivered (files, Milling cutters, gears, spanners). Other specific items were produced for the needs of the Wehrmacht: fuzes for mines and bullets, WHAs for artillery together with forged elements for aviation, navy and railway.

The Nazi officials used slave labor of Polish prisoners and prisoners of war (French and Soviet), killing at work many of them. Shortly before the Soviet offensive, the plant was severely devastated and the valuable machinery was dismantled and taken into the Germany.

=== Polish People's Republic (1947-1989) ===
At the end of World War II, from February to April 1945, the factory produced bridge screws and tools for the army together with the regular files and tools. Some of the workers were also employed in the reconstruction of bridges on the Brda river in the city.

On June 22, 1945, the plant was nationalized and handed over to the Centralized Management of the Metal Industry (Polish: Centralny Zarząd Przemysłu Metalowego) in Warsaw. In 1954, employment reached 655 people, among whom 189 women.

Along the years, the output broadened and was not limited to files and the basic tools:

- taps and dies (1949);
- milling cutters and cutting tools (1957);
- needle files for saws (1955–1960);
- special tools such as metal molds for the plastics processing (1964).

In 1960, exports (which started in 1952) amounted to 25% of the global sell and 35% in 1965. The exports were eased by the 1962 decision of the Council of Ministers to move the plant on the list of enterprises specializing in export production. In the 1970s, the Bydgoszcz Tool Factory "Byfana" or Befana, short for Bydgoska Fabryka Narzędzi had been exporting its products (40% of the total production) to over 40 countries around the world (Soviet Union, USA, East Germany, West Germany, Czechoslovakia, France, Italy, Sweden). In 1973, the factory was incorporated into the General Świerczewski Precision Machinery Factory combine.

"Byfana" shared its expertise in grinding technology with other socialist countries, such as Czechoslovakia, GDR and Romania. Furthermore, factory engineers worked with their peers from the Baildon Steelworks to develop innovative designs aimed at preventing the use of imported semi-finished products.

In the mid-1960s, the authorities decided to start the production of modern precision machines, thanks to the purchase of a Japanese drilling machine and grinding machines from Hungary. Be that as it may, these investments did not meet expectations and the modernization of the plant remained limited. Some of stages of the work (grinding, sawing) had still to be done by hand. In addition employees regularly complained about the working conditions (cramped and poorly ventilated halls, excessive noise, air pollution).

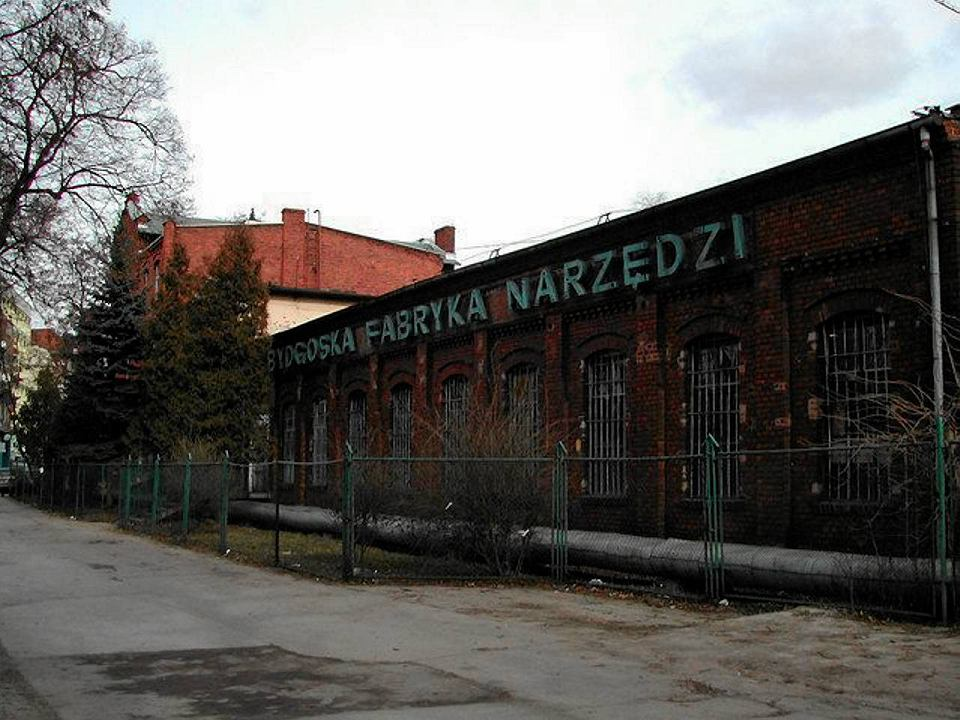
The ancient production site in the early 2000s

In 1973, a new plant was unveiled in Glinky district, at Dąbrowa street, which took over part of the production (taps and dies, molds for plastic, metal and vulcanized item. The same year, the minister of industry divided the company into two separate entities:

- Bydgoszcz Tool Factory "Befana" (Polish: Bydgoską Fabrykę Narzędzi „Befana”) producing catalog tools, with its plant in Marcinkowskiego street;
- Metal Form Plant "Formet" (Polish: Zakład Form Metalowych „Formet”) manufacturing special tools on the site at Dąbrowa street. "Formet" was part of the Ponar-Plast combine and equipped with modern machine tools and measurement equipment. It was one of the largest metal mold factories for the production of plastics in Europe. The factory survived with difficulties the economic Polish Democratization: in August 2012, it went into liquidation due to its large debt and was closed in 2013.

The increasing activity at "Befana" plant required the facility to be relocated out of the congested city center: in 1974, decision was made to move to facility into the vicinity of the Zachem Chemical Plant. Although the building works were scheduled for 1976, the construction was not carried out due to the growing economic crisis of the late 1970s. Between 1976 and 1978, the "Befana" yield increased by 110%. In the 1980s were launched the production of precision files and modern diamond tools with electrogalvanization binder. In 1985, the factory was second in the country in terms of quality and as much as 70% of the production was exported to almost 50 countries worldwide (e.g. United Kingdom, France, Belgium, Netherlands, Italy, Switzerland, USA or Canada).

=== Third Polish Republic (since 1989) ===
On October 1, 1989, the factory was transformed into the joint venture Bydgoska Fabryka Narzędzi (Bydgoszcz Tool Factory) "Befana-Vis" Sp. z o. o.: it had for shareholders the VIS firm, "Mexpol Aussenhandelsgesellschaft m.b.H." (Wilden, Germany) and "DFM Felienfabrik" in Duderstadt.

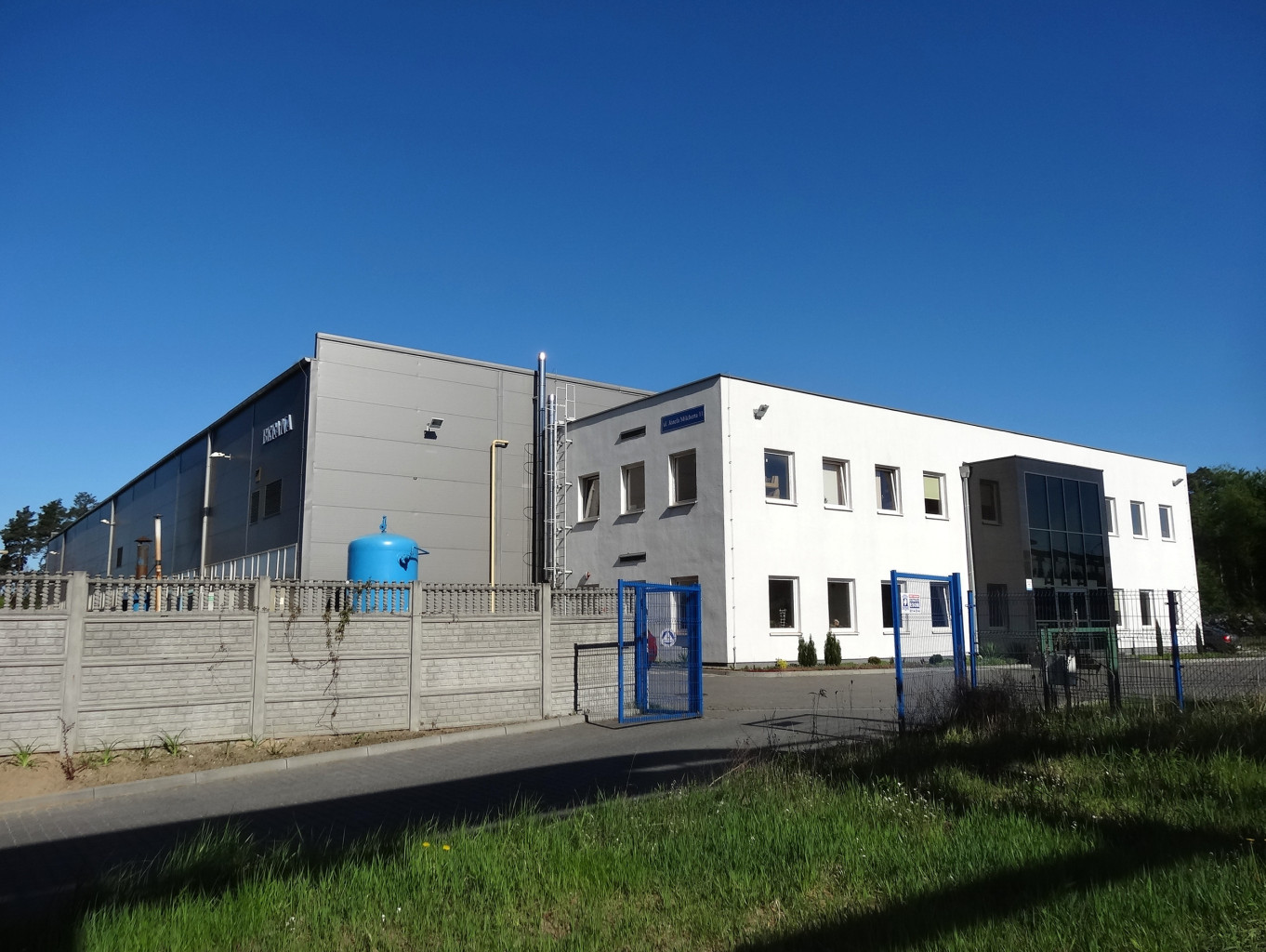
View of the new facility

The production was mainly centered on files and specific rasps for precision industry (watchmaking, needle machines). With the change of management, exports expanded significantly, especially towards Europe, Asia, Africa, North and South Americas.

In 2008, the company moved to its new facility in the Bydgoszcz Industrial and Technology Park. The former premises in downtown (Marcinkowskiego street) were sold out. The new plant allows production for domestic manufactured tools market. The catalog of items grew from 600 in 1989 to 7,000 in 2010.

In 2021, the area of the old factory buildings were partially razed due to their poor technical condition. Some elements will be reconstructed by 2024, as part of the newly real estate project Nowy Port led by AWZ Deweloper.

== Characteristics ==
Bydgoska Tool Factory BEFANA is a manufacturer of metal tools such as sharpening files, wrenches, needles, milling cutters, precision tools, rasps, knurling tools. It also provides services in the field of thermo-chemical treatment of metals.

The company sells products throughout the country through a network of distributors and sales representatives. BEFANA is a leader of file manufacturing on the Polish market and a significant exporter worldwide.

The factory is currently located at 11 Józefa Milcherta street, Bydgoszcz, and employed around 50 people.

On July 1, 2022, the management and employees of the "BEFANA" celebrated the company's 170th anniversary.

== See also ==
- Bydgoszcz
- Prussian Eastern Railway Headquarters, Bydgoszcz
- Zachem Chemical Plant in Bydgoszcz
