= Mangle =

Mangle can refer to:

- Mangle (machine), a mechanical laundry aid consisting of two rollers
- Box mangle, an earlier laundry mangle using rollers and a heavy weight
- Mangled packet, in computing
- Mangrove, woody trees or shrubs
- Name mangling, in computing
- Mangle, an animatronic from the Five Nights at Freddy's game series

== See also ==
- Mangel (disambiguation)
- Mangles (disambiguation)
