= Paweł Jarczewski =

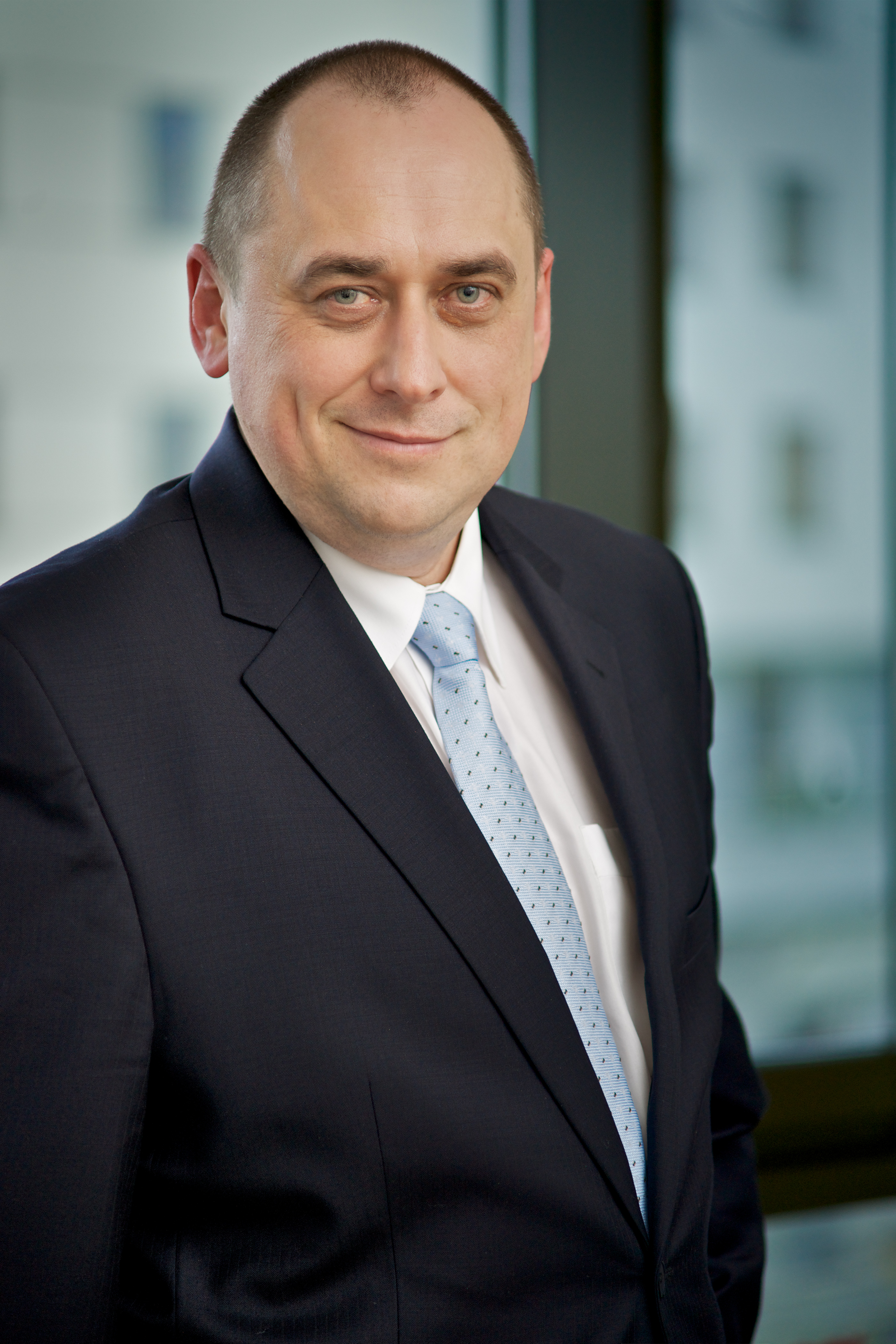
- Born: 4 February 1967 (age 59); Kalisz, Poland
- Citizenship: Poland
- Education: Warsaw School of Economics
- Occupation: Manager
- Predecessor: Krzysztof Lewicki

Paweł Jarczewski (born 4 February 1967 in Kalisz) was the president of the management board of Grupa Azoty until March 2016, and from 2008-2013 he was the president of the management board of Grupa Azoty "PUŁAWY", master of economics. He completed Warsaw School of Economics, at the Department of Foreign Trade, with majors in economics and organisation of foreign trade.

== Business career ==
From May 2013 till March 2016 he served as the president of the management board of Grupa Azoty. Within Grupa Azoty, he was responsible for managing the Capital Group, owner supervision over the entities included in the Group and the Centre of Agro Business in Grupa Azoty. He manages the IT politics, structural-ownership transformations and performance of strategy and personal policy in Grupa Azoty. In the period when he was the president of Grupa Azoty, the following facilities were opened:

- in Grupa Azoty (previously: Zakłady Azotowe in Tarnów-Mościce) the production plant for condensation of carbon dioxide; the construction of a new Polyamide 6 Production Plant in Tarnów was initialised.
- in Grupa Azoty “Puławy”: the Installation for Sulphur Recovery from Exhaust Fumes and New Fertilisation Complex; ammonia storage facility,
- in Zakłady Azotowe “Chorzów” S.A.: the first installation for processing animal fats and plant oils into distilled fatty acids and stearin in the country.
- in Grupa Azoty ZAK S.A.: the installation for production of plasticiser Oxoviflex™; the construction of the new heat and power plant was started,
- in Grupa Azoty “Police”: the project "Police 2" was initiated, the installation for propylene production with PDH method.

Grupa Azoty also funded the acquisition of the Kopalnie and Zakłady Chemiczne Siarki “Siarkopol” S.A.

Until May 2013 he performed the function of the president of the management board of Grupa Azoty “Puławy”. He was connected with Zakłady Azotowe in Puławy since 1992. In 2002-2006 he performed the function of the commercial director of "PULAWY". In 2006-2008 he worked in CTL Logistics S.A. in the position of the director for development. Since 2008 he has been the president of the management board of Grupa Azoty “Puławy”. His actions made Grupa Azoty „Puławy” as one of few European companies in the industry of Great Chemical Synthesis effectively resisted the 2008/2009 crisis with the revenue of PLN 35 million. In November 2012 he was again appointed the president of Grupa Azoty “Puławy” for the next three-year term.

In the period when he performed the function of the president, Grupa Azoty „Puławy” completed the investment in Oxygen Generating Plant Ammonia-Urea which increased production capacity of ureaby ca. 270 thousand tons/year and NOXy® to 100 thousand tons/year.

The company led to consolidation with other plants in the chemical industry. In 2011 Zakłady Azotowe „Puławy” became the controlling shareholder in Zakłady Nawozów Fosforowych “Forsfory” in Gdańsk sp. z o.o. A year later, the company acquired 85% of the shares in Zakłady Azotowe „Chorzów” S.A. (formerly: Adipol-Azoty S.A.).

On 29 April 2013 he ceased to perform the function of the President of Grupa Azoty “Puławy” and was appointed the President of the Management Board of Grupa Azoty. In August he took the position of the head of the Supervisory Board of Grupa Azoty “Police”. In January, the Supervisory Board appointed the management board of the company for the next, 10th term, with Paweł Jarczewski as the head.

== International activity ==
In 2011-2013 he was the vice-president of Fertilizers Europe - the largest Accusation of Producers of Fertilizers in the Old Continent. In addition, he performed the function of the vice-president of the Economical Committee of this organisation.

In May 2014 he was nominated for the position of the Member of the Management Board in the Western and Central IFA region - International Fertilizer Industry Association. In June 2015 he became the President of the Committee for technology, maintenance and safety of production in IFA. He also represents the Company at the forum of European Petrochemical Association (EPCA) and performs the function of the member of the KGHM International Management Board. Moreover, he participates in numerous conference at the national and international level, e.g. at the conference in Davos as the representative of the Polish chemical industry in the world or at Argus FMB Fertiliser Europe.

== Academic activity ==
He performs his obligations as the member of the convention of the Lublin University of Technology and UMCS in Lublin, convention of Warsaw University of Technology and Convention of the Agricultural University named after Hugo Kołłątaj in Cracow. He has also been a member of the Council for Innovation in Lubelskie Voivodship – nomination of the Voivodship Management.

In November 2011 he initiated the cooperation of the Grupa Azoty “Puławy” S.A. with the Institute of Mineral Fertilizers, the Institute of Cultivation, Ferilization and Pedology, Warsaw University of Life Sciences and Higher Educational Institution in Puławy. These entities established the consortium in the Competence Centre “Puławy:” - a platform that is the centre of knowledge exchange between farmers, agricultural advisors, scientific institutions as well as widely understood business.

== Distinctions ==
In November 2013 he was honoured with one of the distinctions of Polish Chemical Awards 2013 as the Top Executive. In November 2014 he was distinguished with a Medal of Honour “Best in Export”. In December 2014 he was distinguished with the title “People of the Decade”, a prize in the ranking organised by the Polish Association for Entrepreneurship Support. He achieved the title of the Person of Year 2014 in the ranking of Gazeta Krakowska.

== Private life ==
He is from Kalisz, but for many years, he has been connected with Puławy. He is married and has two daughters. As an upper secondary school, he used to play the bass guitar in an indie band “Grupa Operacyjna”. At present, he mostly listens to jazz. He is interested in the history of XVII c. Europe, especially military history of Sweden.

== See also ==
- Grupa Azoty S.A.
- Zakłady Azotowe Puławy
