= Mangels (surname) =

Mangels is a surname of Dutch and German origin. It may refer to:

- Alan Mangels (born 1956), Australian football player
- Alby Mangels (born 1948), Australian filmmaker
- Andy Mangels (born 1966), American science fiction writer
- Reed Mangels (born 1955), American nutritionist
- William F. Mangels (1866–1958), American businessman and inventor

== See also ==
- Mangel (surname)
- Mengler
