= Mangel (surname) =

Mangel is a surname. Notable people with the surname include:

- Ernst Michael Mangel (1800–1887), Hungarian musician and composer
- Marcel Mangel, aka Marcel Marceau (1923–2007), French mime
- Laurent Mangel (born 1981), French racing cyclist

Fictional characters:

- The Mangel family in the Australian TV soap opera Neighbours:
  - Kerry Bishop Mangel, wife of Joe Mangel, mother of Sky Mangel
  - Kerry Breanna Mangel, Kerry Mangel, Jr., daughter of Sky Mangel
  - Joe Mangel, son of Len and Nell Mangel
  - Nell Mangel, Eleanor "Nell" Worthington, Nell Worthington, mother of Joe Mangel
  - Sky Mangel, stepdaughter of Joe Mangel
  - Toby Mangel, son of Joe Mangel

== See also ==
- Johanna Mängel (born 1990), Estonian cellist
- Mangels (surname)
- Mangle (machine)
