= Grupa Azoty POLICE =

Grupa Azoty Zakłady Chemiczne „Police” S.A.
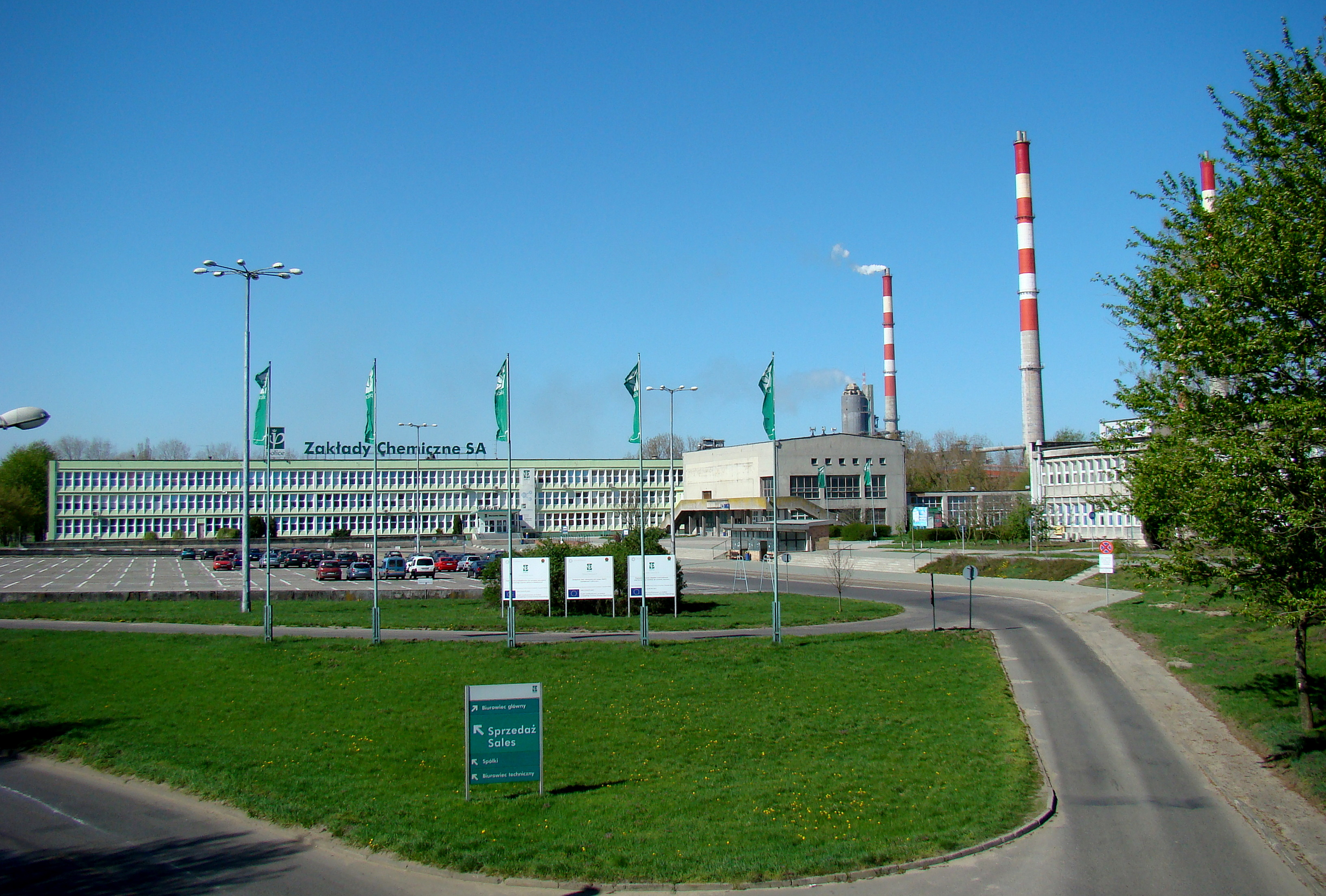
- Company type: Joint-stock company
- Industry: Chemical Industry
- Founded: 1965
- Headquarters: 72-010 Police, ul. Kuźnicka 1, West Pomeranian Voivodeship, Poland
- Key people: Wojciech Wardacki - CEO (since 7.04.2016) Dariusz Hac - Chairman of the supervisory board
- Products: fertilizer, white titanium, ammonia, urea, phosphoric acid, sulfuric acid
- Operating income: 80 796 000 PLN (2014)
- Net income: 64 369 000 PLN (2014)
- Total assets: 2 078 712 000 PLN (2014)
- Total equity: 1 107 333 000 PLN (2014)
- Owners: Grupa Azoty S.A. 66% Agencja Rozwoju Przemysłu S.A. 8,80% State Treasury 5% OFE PZU „Złota Jesień” 15%
- Number of employees: 2380 (2014)
- Website: zchpolice.grupaazoty.com

Grupa Azoty Zakłady Chemiczne "Police" S.A. (abridged name: Grupa Azoty POLICE) is a Polish company in the chemical synthesis industry, based in Police, West Pomeranian Voivodeship, Poland.

The company was established in 1964. Production started in 1969, and in 1995, it was transformed into joint stock company S.A. Since 14 July 2005, the company is publicly traded on the Warsaw Stock Exchange.

Since August 2011 Grupa Azoty Zakłady Chemiczne “Police” S.A. has been incorporated into Grupa Azoty S.A.

== History ==
The decision on construction of a chemical plant in Police, dealing with production of mineral fertilisers was taken in 1964. The chemical plants were located between Police and the village named Jasienica. The construction of the chemical compound was performed in 1964–1970, on 22 July 1969, the first production department was launched – the production plant of sulphuric acid. In 1970, three production plants were commissioned: of sulphuric acid, phosphoric acid and fertiliser. The plants in Police as one of the first in the country produced compound fertilisers (NP). In the next years, the plant producing sodium fluorosilicate and 2nd plant producing phosphoric acid were opened. In the mid-70’s, it was possible to produce a three-component fertiliser NPK. In 1977, Zakład Bieli Tytanowej was commissioned.

At the same time, the logistics base of the plants was developed, e.g. by opening a barge port at the Gunica River. In the 80’s the investments within the construction of the production complex were performed: ammonia and urea production was started as well as the plant generating sulphuric acid was opened with annual production capacity of 500 thousand tons. The production of the first three-component fertiliser was started in plants in Police.

Since 30 December 1995, the plants in Police started their activity under new name – Zakłady Chemiczne “POLICE” S.A. The shares of the Plants in Police debuted on the Warsaw Stock Exchange in July 2005. Since autumn 2011, they are a part of Grupa Azoty. In March 2015, it was decided to construct the installation for production of propylene with PDH method in the scope of the POLICE 2 project. The estimated value of the investment is over PLN 1.7 million.

== Shareholding structure ==
The share capital is PLN 750 million and constitutes 75 million shares. In December 2015 the main shareholders in the company were:

- Grupa Azoty S.A. (former: Zakłady Azotowe w Tarnowie-Mościcach S.A.) – 66%
- Agencja Rozwoju Przemysłu|Agencja Rozwoju Przemysłu S.A. – 8,81%
- Skarb Państwa – 5,01%
- OFE PZU „Złota Jesień” – 15,01%
- Pozostali akcjonariusze – 5,17%

== Management Board ==
- Management Board since 7 April 2016:
  - Wojciech Wardacki – CEO
  - Anna Zarzycka-Rzepecka – vice CEO
  - Tomasz Panas – vice CEO
- Management Board in 2011-2016:
  - Krzysztof Jałosiński – CEO
  - Wojciech Naruć – vice CEO
  - Rafał Kuźmiczonek – vice CEO

== Research and development ==
=== Material projects ===
In 2013, Grupa Azoty Zakłady Chemiczne „Police” S.A. became the controlling shareholder in African Investment Group, owning a concession for phosphorite excavation in Senegal. According to the estimate, about one million ton of phosphorites is to arrive to Poland from Senegal. The size of deposits, which are accessed by POLICE Azoty Group is ca. 56 million tons of phosphorites and one million and half tons of ilmenite sands. In connection with exploitation of phosphorite deposits in Senegal, POLICE Azoty Group considers the possibility of construction of a fertiliser plant in Kenya.

=== Developmental projects ===
In March 2015, Grupa Azoty POLICE announced the construction of the installation for propylene production. The investment will be completed by 2019, and projects the additional construction of the power unit and development of the terminal for liquid chemicals in Police port. The terminal will make it possible to host ships with LPG. The propylene production will allow for opening new chemical installations in the upcoming years, enabling the Company to produce more technologically advanced plastics. The estimated value of the project is PLN 1.7 billion.

== Capital Group ==
Capital Group: The capital group Grupa Azoty POLICE includes:

- Grupa Azoty POLICE Serwis Sp. z o.o. – 100% shares
- „Koncept” sp. z o.o. – 100% shares
- „Transtech” Usługi Sprzętowe i Transportowe Sp. z o.o. – 100% shares
- Zarząd Morskiego Portu Police Sp. z o.o. – 99.98% shares
- „Supra” Sp. z o.o. – 100% shares
- Grupa Azoty AFRICA S.A. – 100% shares
- African Investment Group S.A. – 54,9% shares
- INFRAPARK Police S.A. w likwidacji – 54,43% shares
- „Budchem” sp. z o.o. w upadłości likwidacyjnej – 48,96% shares
- KEMIPOL Sp. z o.o. – 33,99% shares

== Production and specialisation ==
Grupa Azoty POLICE produces compound mineral fertilisers and nitric fertilisers as well as compound fertilisers, ammonia, phosphoric and sulphuric acid, titanium white and side products, such as iron sulphate and post-hydrolytic acid.

=== AGRO segment ===
- Compound fertilisers (NPK, NP) – Polifoska, Polidap,
- Nitric fertilisers (UREA),
- Nitric fertilisers with sulphate (NS).

=== Segment of Chemistry ===
- Titanium white.

== Transport ==
The plant uses water (Police port), railway (Szczecin – Police – Trzebież line) and road transport (voivodship road no. 114).

== Sport and culture support ==
Currently, the plants support the Chemik Police female volleyball club – closely connected with the plant of Grupa Azoty POLICE. In addition Grupa Azoty POLICE supports the Pogoń Szczecin football club. The plants in Police are also a title sponsor of the Azoty Arena sports hall in Szczecin. The company cooperates with the universities from the territory of West Pomeranian voivodship: University in Szczecin, West Pomeranian University of Technology, Marine Academy, West Pomeranian School of Higher Education as well as University of Technology in Warsaw, in Łódź, University of Warsaw and Warsaw School of Economics.

== Famous people connected with Grupa Azoty POLICE ==
- Krzysztof Jałosiński – president of the management board of Zakłady Chemiczne “Police” Azoty Group S.A. in 2011–2016.
- Kazimierz Drzazga – in 1973–1989, mechanic, inspector of controlling-measuring apparatus in Chemical Plants in Police, on 18–30 August 1980, a participant of the strike in Chemical Plants in Police[33].
- Stanisław Kocjan – 1971–1987, employee in the Chemical Plants in Police, since 19 August 1980, a participant of the strike in Chemical Plants in Police.
- Aleksander Doba – Polish traveller, canoeist, winner and explorer, retired employee of the Chemical Plants in Police, honoured with a title of National Geographic Traveller of Year 2014.
- Władysław Diakun – mayor of Police, activist of NSZZ „Solidarność” in chemical plants in Police (union member since 1980).
- Zygmunt Kwiatkowski – the former president of Elektrownia Puławy Sp. z o.o.
- Paweł Jarczewski – former president of Azoty Group S.A., former head of the supervisory board of Grupa Azoty POLICE.

== Interesting facts ==
- on 17 May 2000, on the eve of 80th birthday of the Pope John Paul II, the employees of the Chemical Plants in Police completed a Runner Pilgrimage from Police to Vatican.
- POLICE 2 project projects the construction a larger and more modern installation for propylene production in Europe.
- the tallest chimney of the factory in Police has a height of 205 metres
