= Chemical industry in Poland =

Chemical industry in Poland - one of the key branches of the processing industry which includes:

- organic chemistry industry – manufactures products on the basis of carbohydrates, wood, rubber, fats and other organic substances,
- non-organic chemistry industry – products manufactured on the basis of non-organic substances, e.g. minerals and ores.

Chemical industry in terms of tons of production can be divided into:

- great chemistry - the name refers to the production size of millions tons a year; great chemistry includes the production of fertilisers, fuels, plastics (mainly plasticisers) and industrial gases;
- small chemistry - production on a smaller scale - dozens of tons; this sector includes mainly chemistry with high added value and more expensive production, e.g. medicaments, cosmetics, cleaning agents;
- chemical processing - processing finished half-products: by mixing, packing, thermal treatment and other methods.

Chemical industry is characteristic of the high capital intensity and low labour consumption, for this reason, the most of operations are automated.

== Chemical industry products ==
Divisions within the Polish chemical industry, by types of products and companies, include:

- Coking industry — for example: the coking plants "Radlin", "Jadwiga", "Dębieńsko" in Bytom, Zdzieszowice, Wałbrzych, Zabrze, and Dąbrowa Górnicza; and foundries in Kraków, Częstochowa, and Dąbrowa Górnicza.
- Cleaning products industry.
- Fertilizers industry — for example: Grupa Azoty S.A., with plants in Puławy, Police, Mościce, Kędzierzyn-Koźle, Chorzów, Gdańsk, Grzybów; Anwil S.A. in Włocławek; Zakłady Chemiczne "Alwernia" S.A. in Alwernia; Zakłady Chemiczne "Siarkopol" in Tarnobrzeg; LUVENA S.A. in Luboń; and Fosfan S.A. in Szczecin.
- Paint and varnish industry — for example: production plants in Cieszyn, Dębica, Wrocław, Włocławek, Chorzów and Pilawa.
- Petrochemical industry — government owned PKN Orlen, with refineries in Płock, Jedlicze, and Trzebinia; and the Lotos Group, with refineries in Gdańsk, Czechowice, and Jasło.
- Plastics production and processing industry — for example: Basell Orlen Polyolefins Sp. z o.o., Grupa Azoty, Anwil S.A., Synthos S.A., and CIECH Sarzyna S.A.
- Pharmaceutical industry — for example: pharmaceutical plants in Warsaw, Kraków, Rzeszów, Poznań, Kutno, Starogard Gdański, Jelenia Góra, Pabianice, Łódź, and Grodzisk Mazowiecki.
- Plant protection industry.
- Soda (sodium carbonate) industry — CIECH Soda Polska S.A., including plants in Inowrocław and Janikowo),
- Sulfuric acid industry — for example: KGHM Polska Miedź, Grupa Azoty POLICE, Zakłady Górniczo-Hutnicze Bolesław SA.
- Synthetic fibers industry — including plants in Toruń, Gorzów Wielkopolski, Tomaszów Mazowiecki, and Sohaczew.

== See also ==
- Chemical companies of Poland
- Large scale chemical synthesis in Poland
