= Mangles =

Mangles may refer to several things and people, mostly related to the one family:

== People ==
- Mangles family
- James Mangles (MP) (1768–1838), English merchant and politician
- James Mangles (Royal Navy officer) (1786–1867), FRS, explorer and botanist
- Ross Mangles (1833–1905), recipient of the Victoria Cross

== Others ==
- Mangles Bay, Western Australia
- Mangles River, South Island, New Zealand

== See also ==
- Mangle (disambiguation)
