= Reed Mangels =

American dietician

- Education: B.S. (foods and nutrition), Florida State University; M.S. (nutrition), Case Western Reserve University; Ph.D. (nutrition), University of Maryland
- Occupations: Nutritionist, registered dietitian, lecturer in nutrition at the University of Massachusetts Amherst
- Known for: Research into vegan and vegetarian diets
- Website: "Dr. Reed Mangels"; University of Massachusetts Amherst

Ann Reed Mangels is a registered dietitian and Adjunct Associate Professor in the Department of Nutrition in the School of Public Health and Health Sciences at the University of Massachusetts Amherst, specializing in vegan and vegetarian nutrition. She is the author or co-author of numerous papers and books on the subject, including the American Dietetic Association's position paper on vegan and vegetarian diets, Vegan & Vegetarian FAQ (2001), The Dietitian's Guide to Vegetarian Diets (2004), and The Everything Vegan Pregnancy Book (2011).

Mangels is nutrition adviser for the Vegetarian Resource Group, and nutrition editor for Vegetarian Journal.

== Selected publications ==
Books

- The Everything Vegan Pregnancy Book. Adams Media, 2011.
- with Virginia Messina and Mark Messina. The Dietitian's Guide to Vegetarian Diets: Issues and Applications. 3rd ed. Jones and Bartlett, 2010.
- with Debra Wasserman. Simply Vegan: Quick Vegetarian Meals. Vegetarian Resource Group, 2006.
- with David Gypsy Breier. Vegan & Vegetarian FAQ. Vegetarian Resource Group, 2001.

Papers/book chapters

- Mangels, Ann Reed; Holden, Joanne M.; Beecher, Gary R.; Forman, Michele R.; Lanza, Elaine (1993). "Carotenoid content of fruits and vegetables: An evaluation of analytic data". Journal of the American Dietetic Association. 93 (3): 284–296. doi:10.1016/0002-8223(93)91553-3. PMID 8440826.
- Chug-Ahuja, Jaspreet K.; Holden, Joanne M.; Forman, Michele R.; Mangels, Ann Reed; Beecher, Gary R.; Lanza, Elaine (1993). "The development and application of a carotenoid database for fruits, vegetables, and selected multicomponent foods". Journal of the American Dietetic Association. 93 (3): 318–323. doi:10.1016/0002-8223(93)91559-9. PMID 8440830.
- Messina, Virginia; Reed Mangels, ANN (2001). "Considerations in Planning Vegan Diets". Journal of the American Dietetic Association. 101 (6): 661–669. doi:10.1016/S0002-8223(01)00167-5. PMID 11424545.
- Mangels, Ann Reed; Messina, Virginia (2001). "Considerations in planning vegan diets". Journal of the American Dietetic Association. 101 (6): 670–677. doi:10.1016/S0002-8223(01)00169-9. PMID 11424546.
- Craig, W. J.; Mangels, A. R.; American Dietetic Association (2009). "Position of the American Dietetic Association: Vegetarian Diets". Journal of the American Dietetic Association. 109 (7): 1266–1282. doi:10.1016/j.jada.2009.05.027. PMID 19562864. S2CID 7906168.
- Messina, Virginia; Melina, Vesanto; Mangels, Ann Reed (2003). "A new food guide for North American vegetarians". Journal of the American Dietetic Association. 103 (6): 771–775. doi:10.1053/jada.2003.50141. PMID 12778051. S2CID 25860080.
- American Dietetic Association (2003). "Position of the American Dietetic Association and Dietitians of Canada: Vegetarian diets". Journal of the American Dietetic Association. 103 (6): 748–765. doi:10.1053/jada.2003.50142. PMID 12778049.
- Block, Gladys; Mangels, Ann R.; Patterson, Blossom H.; Levander, Orville A.; Norkus, Edward P.; Taylor, Philip R. (1999). "Body Weight and Prior Depletion Affect Plasma Ascorbate Levels Attained on Identical Vitamin C Intake: A Controlled-Diet Study". Journal of the American College of Nutrition. 18 (6): 628–637. doi:10.1080/07315724.1999.10718898. PMID 10613415.
- Mangels, A. R.; Moser-Veillon, P. B.; Patterson, K. Y.; Veillon, C. (1990). "Selenium utilization during human lactation by use of stable-isotope tracers". The American Journal of Clinical Nutrition. 52 (4): 621–627. doi:10.1093/ajcn/52.4.621. PMID 2403057.
- Moser-Veillon, P. B.; Mangels, A. R.; Vieira, N. E.; Yergey, A. L.; Patterson, K. Y.; Hill, A. D.; Veillon, C. (2001). "Calcium Fractional Absorption and Metabolism Assessed Using Stable Isotopes Differ between Postpartum and Never Pregnant Women". The Journal of Nutrition. 131 (9): 2295–2299. doi:10.1093/jn/131.9.2295. PMID 11533269.
- Block, Gladys; Mangels, Ann R.; Norkus, Edward P.; Patterson, Blossom H.; Levander, Orville A.; Taylor, Philip R. (2001). "Ascorbic Acid Status and Subsequent Diastolic and Systolic Blood Pressure". Hypertension. 37 (2): 261–267. doi:10.1161/01.HYP.37.2.261. PMID 11230282.
- Mangels, Ann Reed (2014). "Bone nutrients for vegetarians". The American Journal of Clinical Nutrition. 100: 469S–475S. doi:10.3945/ajcn.113.071423. PMID 24898231.
