= Zachem Chemical Plant in Bydgoszcz =

Chemical company in Bydgoszcz, Poland

Coordinates: 53°07′04″N 17°58′52″E

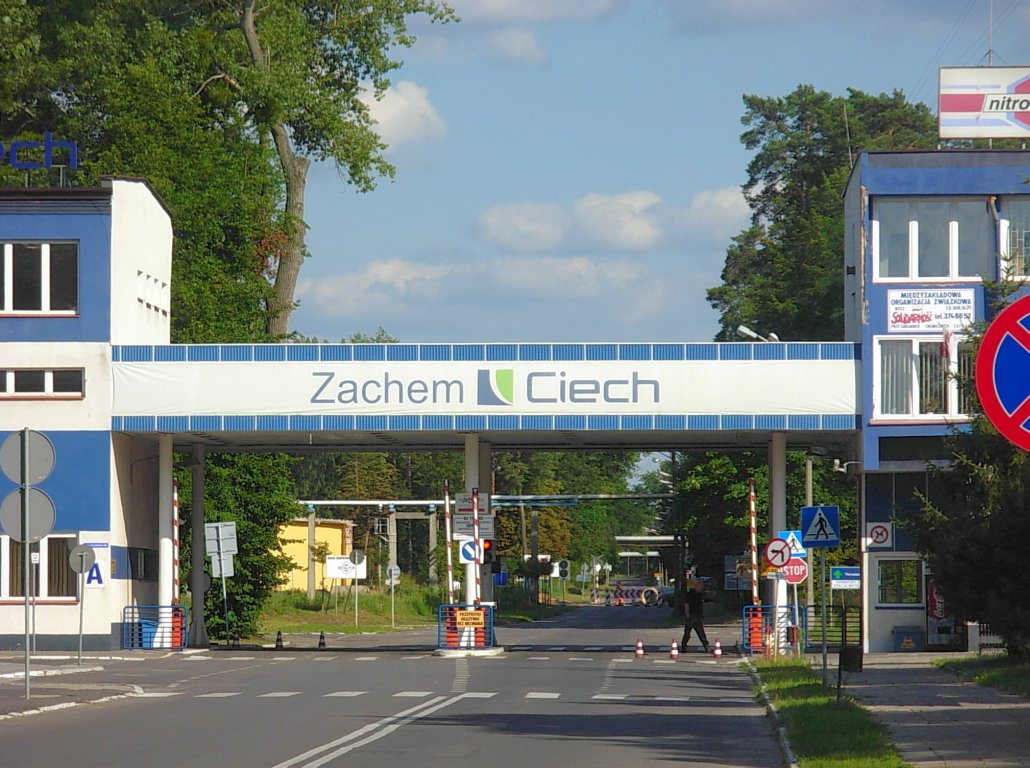
- Main gate
- Type: Public company and Privately held company
- Industry: Chemical industry
- Founded: 1948 in Bydgoszcz, Poland
- Founder: Polish government
- Defunct: 2014
- Fate: Bankruptcy / Disbanded
- Successors: Ciech Pianki Sp. z o.o., Boruta-Zachem Kolor S.A.
- Headquarters: Bydgoszcz, Poland
- Products: Explosive, PVC, Pigments, Phenol, DNT, Polyurethane/Polyurethane foams, TDA, TDI
- Number of employees: (7300 (1970s))

Zachem Chemical Plant in Bydgoszcz or Zachem was a firm established in 1948 in Bydgoszcz, Poland, and liquidated in 2014. Zachem was operating in the domain of chemical synthesis. Several of its activities survived in local enterprises in and around Bydgoszcz.

== History ==
=== Prelude ===
The company was located on the premises of the former Bromberg Dynamit Nobel AG Factory (1939–1945), built by the Third Reich, which manufactured explosives and handloading ammunition for the needs of the Wehrmacht. The plant consisted of several hundred buildings, including large blast-proof concrete bunkers.

A specific housing estate had been built in 1940–1944, for the German management staff of the AG Factory, who had to quickly reach the plant in case of breakdown. Located today between Hutnicza and Nowotoruńska streets, it is still called "Osiedle Awaryjne" (Emergency estate). Nearby, 100 brick-and-wooden barracks for forced laborers and POW were built. After WWII, 57 buildings of the ensemble housed some 2,000 people, working at the Zachem plant.

In 1945, following the decisions of the Red Army's "Commission of War Trophies", Soviet troops transported all technical equipment to the Soviet Union: about 1,800 loaded railway wagons were used. The looting left behind only empty buildings, hundreds of kilometers of internal roads and production lines, branch lines, underground and overhead networks. In the summer of 1945, after the withdrawal of the Red Army, units of the Internal Security Corps, subordinated to Moscow, guarded the factory.

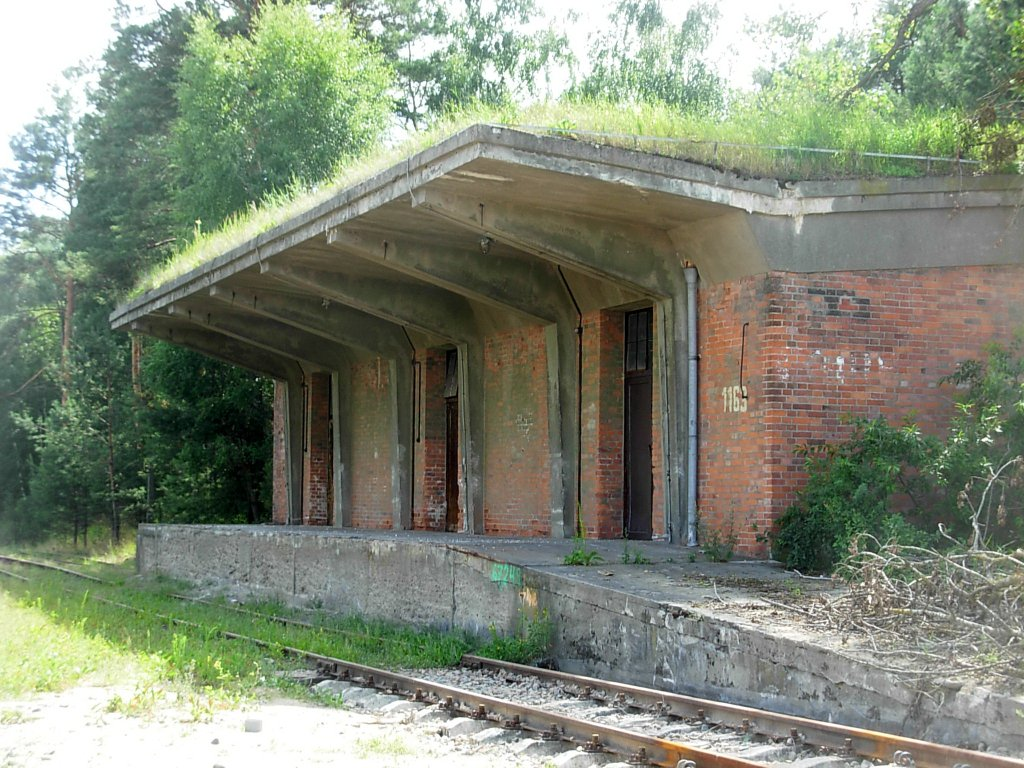
Loading station from the DAG Fabrik Bromberg

In July 1945, the plant moved under the responsibility of the Central Board of the Polish Chemical industry and later was taken over by the Central Board of the Arms industry based in Warsaw. Eugeniusz Smoliński was nominated in April 1945 as "temporary General Director" of the facility.

As a legacy of the DAG Fabrik Bromberg plant, Zachem possessed 475 buildings operating several production lines for nitroglycerin ("NGL-Betrieb"), nitrocellulose ("NC-Betrieb"), gunpowder ("POL-Betrieb"), high explosives ("TRI/DI -B Betrieb"), handloading ammunition ("FÜLSTELLE") and sulfuric acid ("LURGI-Betrieb"). In addition, Zachem inherited, among others, 360 kilometres (220 mi) of concrete or granite cobblestone roads, 40 kilometres (25 mi) of railway tracks with four reloading stations, three power plants with a total capacity of 50 MW, an industrial water collector from the Vistula River and 25 deep drinking water wells.

Various attempts to convert the German production lines between 1956 and 1980 were performed, with only partial success: the plant producing explosives was reused, but not those manufacturing nitroglycerin or gunpowder. Some of the old buildings were crushed with explosives in the 1970s, to make room for a new department of plastics production: the rubble was moved into the swampy bed of the mouth of the Brda river to the Vistula.

=== Early years ===
On the eastern part of the premises, the Central Board set up a state-owned powder plant, in today's Łęgnowo district. In 1951, it was renamed Chemical Plant nr.9 (Polish: Wytwórnia Chemiczna nr.9). The western part, initially called Wytwórnia Chemiczna nr.11, did not operate any production; in 1956 it was incorporated into the "Wytwórnia Chemiczna nr. 9". According to the Polish central authorities intents, the factory ensemble was destined to be entirely liquidated.

In mid-1947, this decision was suspended. The 465 employee team started the production of explosives for mining, which was one of the main effort of the national economy. Furthermore, Eugeniusz Smoliński was arrested in August 1947 and accused of sabotage because of a delay in the explosive production. In 1949, he was sentenced to death and executed.

In 1948, the authorities decided to resume the production of explosive, amid the tensions raised from the Cold War. The qualified workers were to be found among employees of a pre-war gunpowder factory in Pionki and people working in the former DAG Fabrik Bromberg. On 4 December 1948, the production of TNT for mining and weaponry commenced, emblematically symbolising the birth of the Bydgoszcz chemical plant.

The construction of housing estates for employees of "Zakłady Chemiczne" started in the late 1940s. Hence in December 1948, housing were made available in at Glinki street: these were former barracks for Polish workers of the DAG factory in 1939–1945. In addition, some engineers lived in five renovated villas located at Szpitalna street, which were occupied during the war by German cadres.

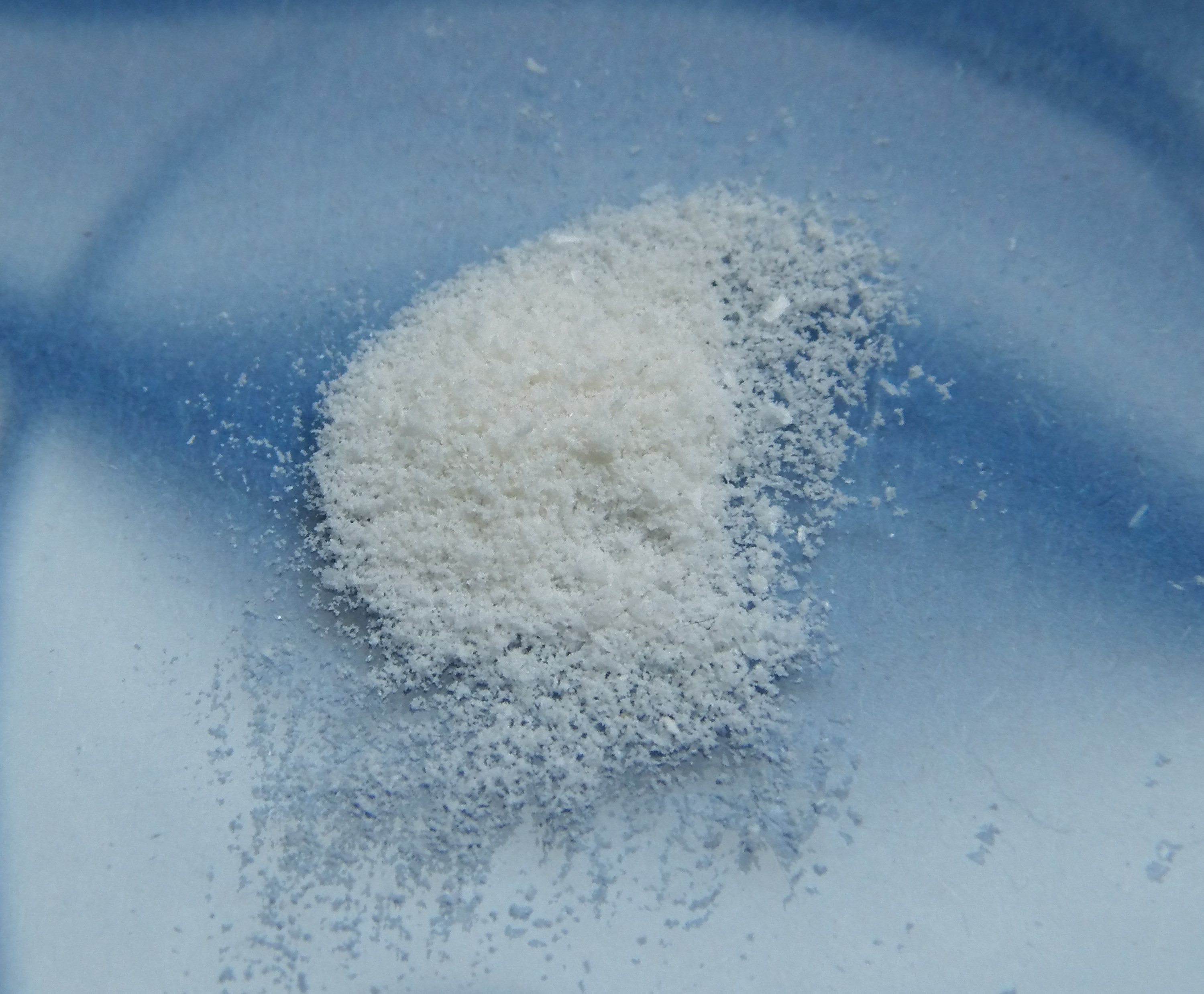
Hexogen crystals combined with acetone

As part of the Six-Year Plan (1950–1956), it was decided to build a large housing estate for workers with schools, clinics, a community center and a library, in the Socialist realism style. The scheme included an extension of the housing estate in Łęgnowo, dating back to 1940, as well as the construction of a housing ensemble on Kapuściska district, close to the gate nr.2 of the chemical plant. At the same time, the "Osiedle Awaryjne" was also modernized up to the modern standards (including a library, a nursery, a canteen, a milk bar and an outdoor swimming pool).

The plant used part of the ex-Nazi infrastructure, conducting secret production of TNT and hexogen (from 1950) for the armies of the Warsaw Pact. At the time, 80 tons of explosives were produced daily. In 1951, a second line for the TNT production was launched, followed two years later by the first products exported to socialist countries and China. These exportations, in time, accounted for a quarter of the sales.

In 1950, a dedicated incineration yard was set up, in the Żółwin area, replacing open-sky burning performed on a square at Dąbrowa Street. The place, a north-sloping dune overgrown with grass, was located in an abandoned village at the intersection with the former road running between Bydgoszcz and Toruń. The incineration site was located several hundred meters east of the edge of the plants and was accessed by a concrete road (preserved to this day) built for the needs of D.A.G. Fabrik Bromberg.

Hasty, experimental and makeshift solutions in the field of production technology led to a number of failures. Hence on 19 November 1952, a powerful explosion occurred on the TNT production line, killing 15 workers, injuring 84 and destroying 132 buildings. It left an 80 metres (260 ft) diameter crater on the site and the effects of the explosion were felt 15 kilometres (9.3 mi) away. At the time, the accident was identified as sabotage and cadres were sentenced to one to three years of jail. It's only in 1999 that a plaque commemorating the victims of the 1952 tragedy was placed at the plant's gates.

In 1968, another, less dramatic, incident happened.

=== Peak of activity ===
The détente following Joseph Stalin's death in 1953, challenged the existence of the factory. To maintain its activity, it was decided to expand the production panel with chemical intermediates such as dye and plastics, developed in the departments created in 1956:

- "Dyes";
- "Plastics synthesis";
- "Organic intermediates";
- "Experimental and special department" (i.e. production of explosives).

Subsequent to these reorganisations, new production lines were launched in Bydgoszcz, manufacturing, among others, aniline, nitrobenzene, toluidine, hydrazine, colorants, polyvinite or phenol. Local brine from mines in Inowrocław was used for production. In 1967, Zachem had been employing more than 5,000 people and its annual output amounted PLN 1.7 billion.

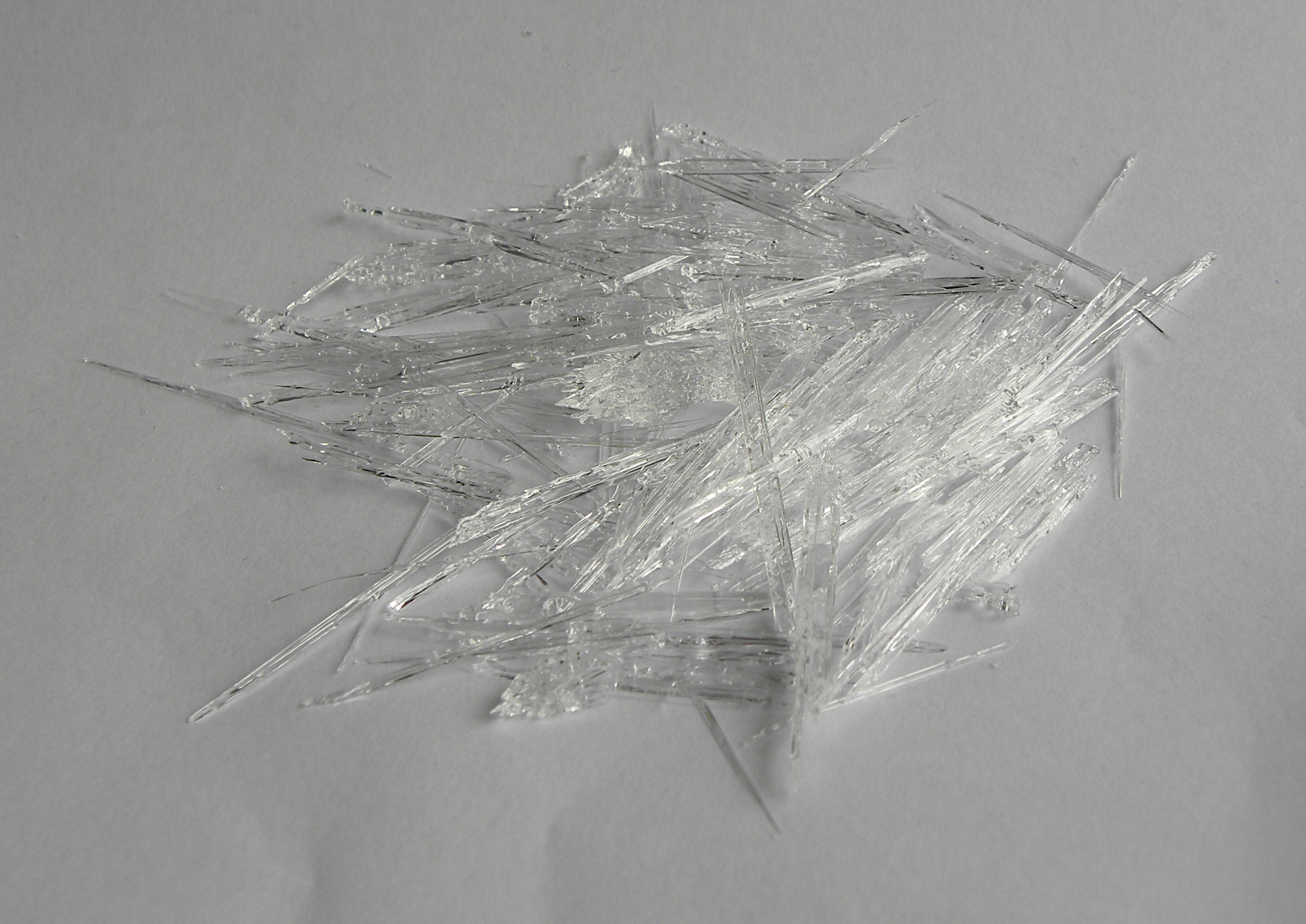
Phenol

The production capacity of "Zachem" in Bydgoszcz largely exceeded the national needs, hence, in the 1960s, it was only operating at 75% of its power. Abroad, semi-finished products could hardly compete with foreign products due to their low quality.

At the height of its activity, the plant occupied an area of 484 hectares (1,200 acres), criss-crossed with 120 kilometres (75 mi) of roads, 70 kilometres (43 mi) of railway sidings and 200 kilometres (120 mi) of high-voltage power grids. In 1976, the site had a workforce of 7278 people and a further 6000 worked in subcontracted companies. The premises also comprised, inter alia, a specific bus transport system, a school, a canteen, a clinic, a community center, a sports club, a stadium, a hall, a cinema, a newspaper, a printing house, workers' hotels, a fire brigade, a pig house and even its own railway station ("Bydgoszcz Żółwin"). Furthermore, factory blocks were added in the neighbouring "Osiedle Awaryjne". The two gates of the plant (at Wojska Polskiego and Hutnicza streets) were connected in 1953 with a tram line. The company's had a dedicated House of Culture, located next to the boat racing track on the Brda River. The facility had a common room, a library and a reading room and was equipped with musical instruments for an entire orchestra. Two fully equipped gymnasiums were built next to the House of Culture.

The firm possessed a vacation center by the Baltic Sea in Sopot and a sanatorium in Ciechocinek. Furthermore, between 1974 and 1984, a stadium and a sports hall were erected in the nearby district of Wyżyny, for the exclusive benefit of the company's sports club, the Chemik Bydgoszcz.

The vast wooded area of the factory was strictly secured with a double barbed wire fence and protected by a 100-people strong unit of the Industrial Guard (Polish: Straż Przemysłowa) equipped with carbines and submachine guns. The "Straż Przemysłowa" controlled the entrances, patrolled the compound and escorted the "S" transports (special materials). Despite security measures and thorough employee scannings, incidents were not rare: in 1969, a personnel tried to steal 1.5 kg of TNT from the plant.

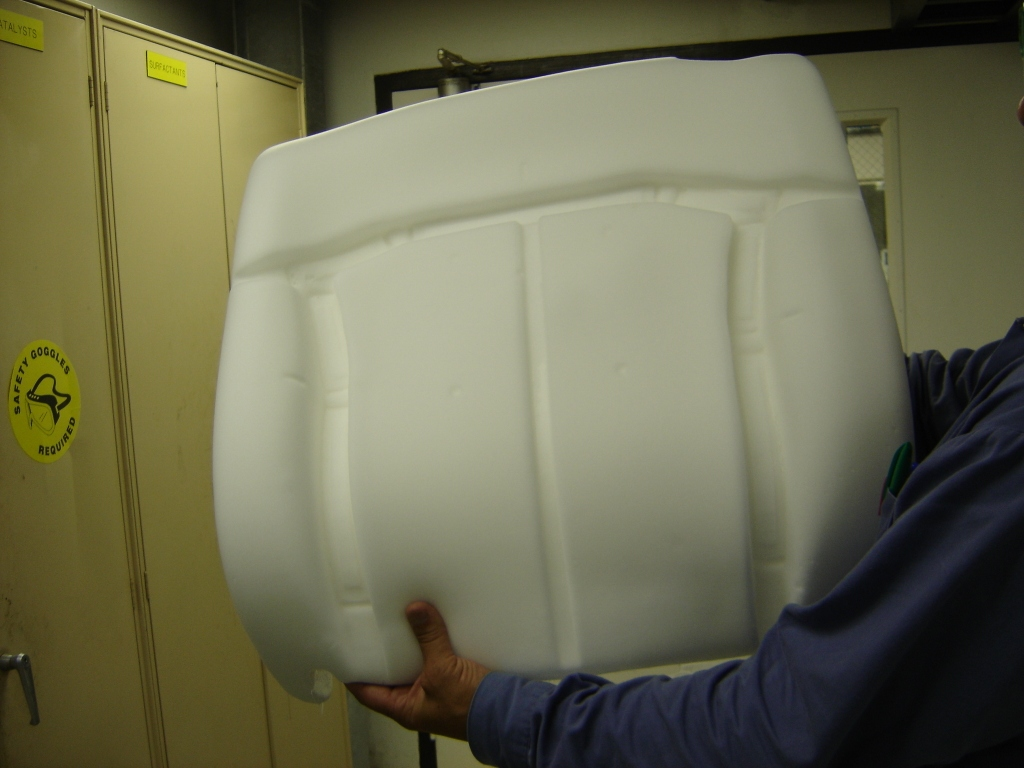
Car seatback in polyurethane foam

In the early 1970s, pursuant to the purchase by the Polish Communist authorities of a license to manufacture the Polski Fiat 126p, Zachem was given the British technology for the production of polyurethane foams. In the years 1976 to 1981, a synthetic resins production line of ECH was set up, based on a modified foreign license. In the second half of the 1970s, efforts were made to develop an entire domestic production, replacing foreign raw materials with local substitutes. In 1976, the plant was incorporated into the Union of the Organic Industry "Organika", changing its name to Zakłady Chemiczne "Organika-Zachem" ("Chemical Plant Organika-Zachem"). The limited financial resources of the company at the end of the 1970s prevented any investment in the domain of the protection of the environment.

In the 1970s, 90% of Zachem's export was channeled to Western countries (Switzerland, Italy, Great Britain, West Germany, Netherlands, Spain, France, United States, Japan). Sales mainly covered chemical intermediate products such as aniline, ECH, polyvinyl chloride and synthetic dyes. In 1987, the company was ranked second in the Bydgoszcz Voivodeship in terms of export transactions with 28 million Dollars.

In the turn of the 1980s, the installations were largely outdated and worn out, threatening to contaminate the environment. Roads, sewerage, water supply, power and communication networks dating from WWII were still operated without any repairs. Despite this situation, in 1983, the production of rigid polyurethane foam boards was launched, followed a year later by the manufacturing of dyed metal complex plates. The making of polyvinyl chloride was also increased. As for the "Osiedle Awaryjne", some of its public buildings were converted into flats and the swimming pool was closed. In 1976, a valve failure on a chlorine tanker occurred, but the news of it have not been announced to the inhabitants of Bydgoszcz before nine years.

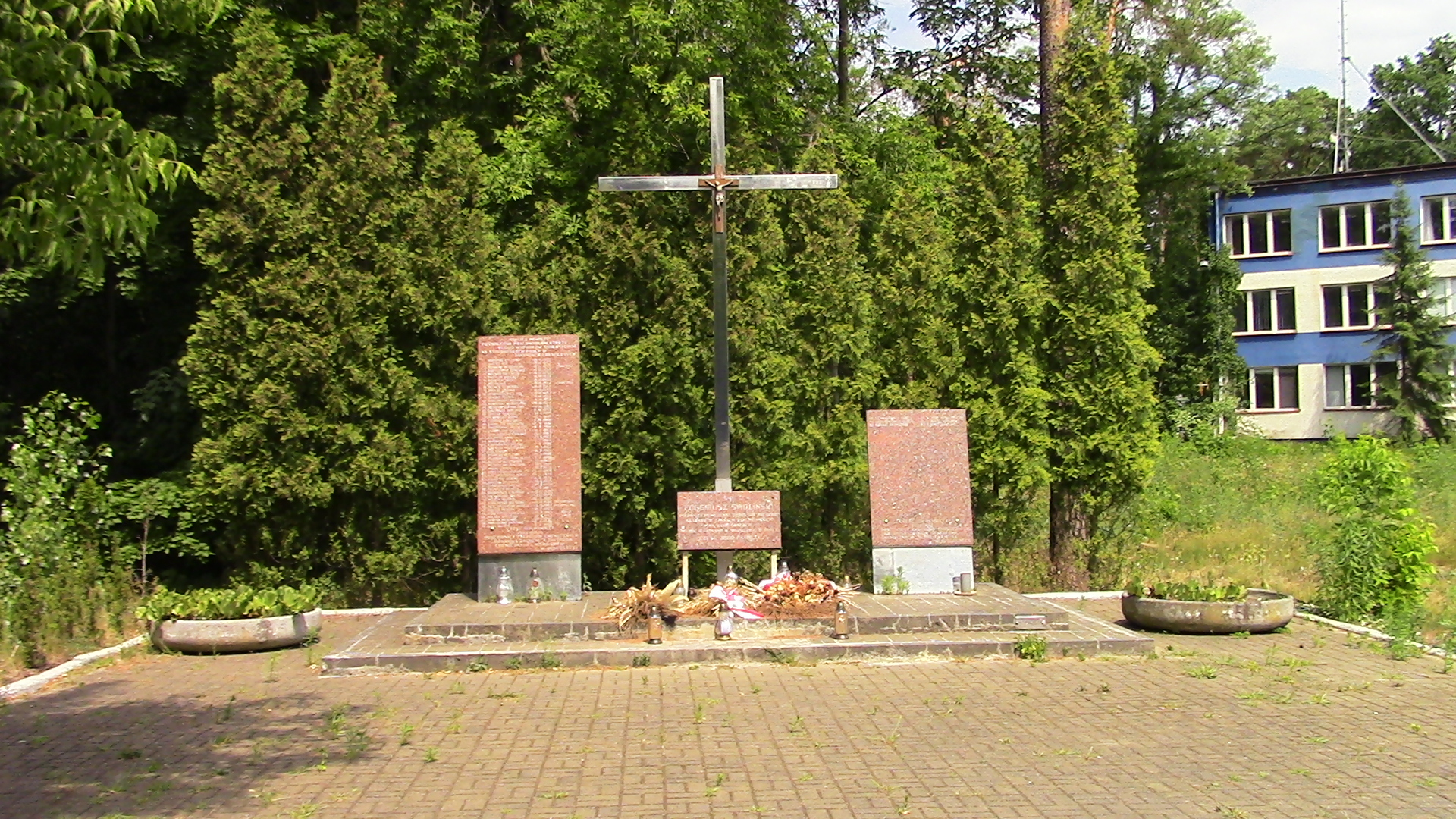
Solidarność monument to the workers in Zachem

In 1981, the "Solidarność" union supported the erection of a monument on the factory premises, so as to remember the employees who died in connection with accidents at work in Zachem. Despite the harsh resistance of the communist authorities, the cross was finally built close to the gate at Wojska Polskiego street.

The plant became one of the biggest polluters in the Bydgoszcz Voivodeship. Stacks of industrial waste (sludge, tar, combustion dust, gypsum) were stored:

- 90,000 m^{3} of sewage was released into the Vistula, subjected to only partial mechanical treatment;
- post-production fumes were directly emitted into the atmosphere during the production process of phenol, aniline, nitro compounds, dyes and chlorine.

The deterioration of the water quality in the Vistula valley downstream of the plant was officially confirmed as early as 1963, after complaints from the inhabitants of Plątnowo and Łęgnowo districts. As a consequence, the inhabitants of Łęgnowo and Otorowo villages were provided with clean and free water from 1969 to 2014.

406 sources of pollutant emissions were identified in Zachem, among which poisonous, paralyzing and toxic compounds such as hydrogen chloride, ammonia, phosgene or freon. This atmospheric pollution caused the decline of over 60 hectares (150 acres) of pines in the Bydgoszcz forest. In addition, the threatened area comprised housing estates built in the vicinity of the company in the districts of Kapuściska, Wyżyny, Glinki and "Osiedle Awaryjne".

On 28 December 1989, the Bydgoszcz Provincial Court ordered the immediate cessation of phenol production by the factory. In the same year, it was estimated that 30 percent of the land surrounding the industrial plant was contaminated.

=== Restructuring after 1989 ===
In 1990, the plant privatisation could not be carried out due to governmental inconsistent policies.

At the beginning of the 1990s, some of Zachem's installations were particularly noxious for the environment: the production of phenol, nitrobenzene, aniline were stopped, together with some dye manufacturing plants. In addition, the use of freon in the production of foams was halted.

In 1992, the production of TDI was ramped up (from 7000 to 30,000 tons in 1997), the PVC processing lines were modernized (1998), production of polyurethanes foams, polyvinyl chloride and epichlorohydrin were also developed.

The plant succeeded in reducing the amount of solid waste and gases discharged into the atmosphere. It constructed in 1997 a new, isolated, landfill, a central sewage station and established a company for the construction of "Kapuściska", an industrial wastewater treatment. Additionally, in the 1990s, an automated foam plant and a chemical rescue station were built.

In 1992, the production of explosives was detached from the company and became Zakłady Chemiczne "Nitro-Chem" (Chemical Plant "Nitro-Chem"). After this split up, "Zakłady Chemiczne Organika Zachem" had a workforce of 2,894 people. Moreover, the firm let 16 subsidiary enterprises break up and merged into the so-called "Zachem Group". Eventually, thanks to foreign capital, the processing of polyurethanes was incorporated into a new company "Natural Chemical Products".

In 2001, Zachem met both the environmental targets (ISO 14001 standards) and the health targets (BS 8800 standards). Furthermore, 43% of the company's sales was realized abroad. From 2001 to 2003, a thorough modernization of the TDI production line was carried out, allowing to double the capacity. In 2005, the company "Zachem Barwniki" was set up, manufacturing dyes, pigments, optical brighteners and disinfectants.

In 2008, "Zakłady Chemiczne Organika-Zachem" structure consisted of the following production departments:

- "Kompleks Monomerów" (TDI an EPI);
- "Centrum Biznesowe Pianki" (Foam Business Center) (polyurethane foam);
- "Centrum Biznesowe Tworzywa" (Plastics Business Center) (plastics).

Its weight in the domestic market was variable:

- TDI – over 50% (45,000 tons);
- ECH – nearly 100%;
- PVC – around 30%;
- Polyurethane foams – approx. 17%.

Zachem was the fifth largest producer of TDI in Europe (4% of the market share).

=== Privatisation ===
In 2006, Zachem employed about 1200 employees and was one of the largest employers in Bydgoszcz. The area of the plant covered 484 hectares (1,200 acres). It was then the only polish company to produce TDI, ECH and allyl chloride.

This year, the privatization of the national chemical sector began. The Polish firm CIECH declared its interest in purchasing Zachem, then in the hands of "Nafta Polska", a state-owned company. The transaction was finalized on 20 December 2006: CICEH bought 80% of the shares for 80 million Złotys, with a promise to invest additional 176 million Złotys by the end of 2011. After the takeover, Zachem achieved only the following two years with a positive economic result. From 2009, it regularly generated growing losses.

The 2008 financial crisis dictated significant restructuring changes for CIECH towards Zachem:

- a separate company dealing with polyurethane foams, Ciech Pianki was established (2011);
- "Zachem Barwniki" merged with another subsidiary, Boruta – Kolor Sp. z o.o., located in Zgierz (2008);
- the production of plastics was sold to "Polivinyl S.A." (2012).

In 2011, "Zachem" registered a 59 million PLN loss and the number of employees fell to 1000.

In October 2012, CIECH signed a 43-million-Euro agreement with the company BASF for the sale of TDI production line and technologies, leading to the closure of Zachem's TDI plant.

At the end of 2012, the company ceased production, laying off 700 personnel. The installations left on the 400 hectares of land were turned off and partially dismantled.

The tearing down of the equipments lasted several years after the closure and ended only in the summer of 2020. A large memorial made of four steel tanks mounted on a concrete five-arm structure was erected along Peterson street.

=== Bankruptcy ===
On 27 June 2013, the company changed its name to Infrastruktura Kapuściska S.A. (IK) and turned to infrastructure management and media supply to business entities. On 30 December 2013, the IK's management board filed for bankruptcy, due to the lack of accounting liquidity.

On 14 March 2014, the court confirmed the firm bankruptcy. Its assets were valued 133 million PLN: it included warehouses, halls, road and infrastructure networks. Without any potential buyer, former Zachem's assets were sold in parts on 8 July 2014. On 21 December 2015, the city of Bydgoszcz purchased, for 1.2 million PLN, 9 kilometres (5.6 mi) of streets covering a 19 hectares (47 acres) area of the former industrial premises.

As part of the development of the ex-production land, unused facilities and installations keep being torn down, such as the former facility for recovering nitric acid (dating back to the German Nobel time) on Hechlińskiego street in summer 2021.

== Characteristics ==
Zakłady Chemiczne "Zachem" had been producing explosives until 1992, dyes, polyurethane (PUR) and a number of semi-finished chemical products.

=== Legacy ===
After the bankruptcy of the company in 2014, its activities survived in several enterprises, including:

- Nitrochem S.A. (Bydgoszcz), producing explosives. The firm belongs to the state owned "Polski Holding Obronny sp. z o.o.";
- Boruta-Zachem S.A. (Bydgoszcz), manufacturing dyes, pigments, optical brighteners, household chemicals and cosmetic products based on surfactants. It was established from the merger of "Zachem-Barwniki" and "Zakładów Przemysłu Barwników Organika-Boruta" located in Zgierz;

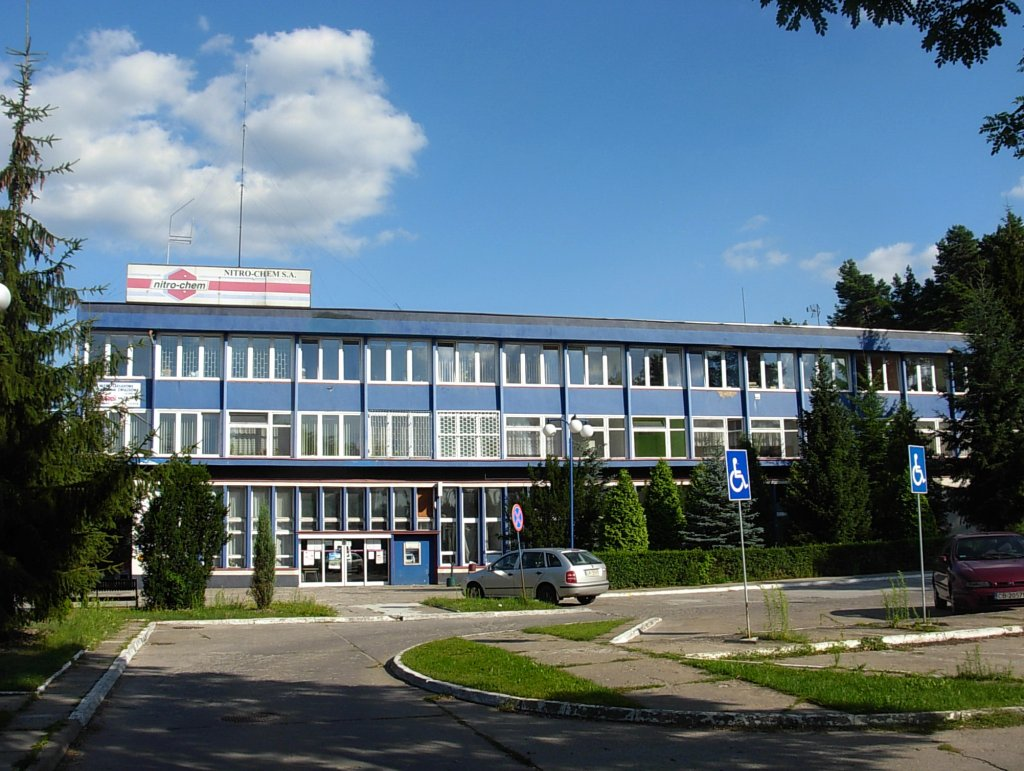
Seat of Nitrochem – Bydgoszcz

- Metalko sp. z.o.o (Bydgoszcz), producing chemical equipment. It employs 220 employees and owns 3 independent plants;
- Transchem (Włocławek) and Ciech Transclean sp. z.o.o. (Bydgoszcz), offering transport for chemicals;
- Metalpur (Bydgoszcz), manufacturing PUR foam blocks and boards;
- Sopur Innowacyjno-Wdrożeniowa sp. z.o.o. (Bydgoszcz), producing lacquers, wood stains and wood oils;
- Purinova (Bydgoszcz), producing polyester polyols and polyurethane systems;
- Wytwórnia Pianek Poliuretanowych sp. z o.o. (Bydgoszcz), manufacturing foam moldings for furniture, automotive and railway industries;
- UCR Technika sp. z o.o. (Bydgoszcz), offering services for the continuity of operation in industrial facilities.

Non-purchased areas from the former premises have been included from 2004 by steps into the "Bydgoszcz Industrial and Technological Park" located south east of the city.

The so-called "Stare Kapuściska" district, built between 1951 and 1960, is the former housing estate of Zachem's workers. Now included into the Kapuściska district, part of the area houses today the "Zespół Szkół Chemicznych im Ignacego Łukasiewicza w Bydgoszczy" (Ignacy Łukasiewicz Chemistry School Complex) (today's "Technikum Nr.4"), on the compound of the former Zachem factory school, founded in 1950.

The factory's hotel ("Hotel Chemik") still exists today, as well as its sports clubs: the "Chemik Bydgoszcz" (est. 1949) and the volleyball club BKS Visła Bydgoszcz (est. 1956).

=== Naming ===
During its existence, the company bore the following names:

- 1945–1948 – "Państwowa Wytwórnia Prochu w Łęgnowie" ("National Gunpowder Factory in Łęgnowo");
- 1948–1951 – "Wytwórnia Nitrozwiązków Łęgnowo" ("Nitrochemical Plant in Łęgnowo");
- 1951–1959 – "Wytwórnia Chemiczna nr 9 w Łęgnowie" ("Chemical Plant No. 9 in Łęgnowo");
- 1959–1971 – "Zakłady Chemiczne w Bydgoszczy" ("Chemical Plant in Bydgoszcz");
- 1971–1976 – "Zakłady Chemiczne Zachem w Bydgoszczy" ("Zachem Chemical Plant in Bydgoszcz");
- 1976–2003 – "Zakłady Chemiczne Organika-Zachem w Bydgoszczy" ("Chemical Plant Organika-Zachem in Bydgoszcz);
- 2003–2012 – "Zakłady Chemiczne Zachem S.A. w Bydgoszczy" ("Zachem Chemical Plant S.A. in Bydgoszcz")
- 2012–2014 – "Infrastruktura Kapuściska S.A.".

=== Sport sponsoring ===
Two sports clubs are perpetuating the sponsoring history of the Zachem company: Chemik Bydgoszcz and BKS Visła Bydgoszcz.

In 1949, the "Wisła Łęgnowo" Sports Club was established at the Chemical Plant nr.11. A sport field was built near the House of Culture. In 1951, at the Chemical Plant nr.9, a company sports club was established, "Unia Łęgnowo". In 1955, the two sports associations merged and adopted a common name: "Unia-Wisła Łęgnowo".

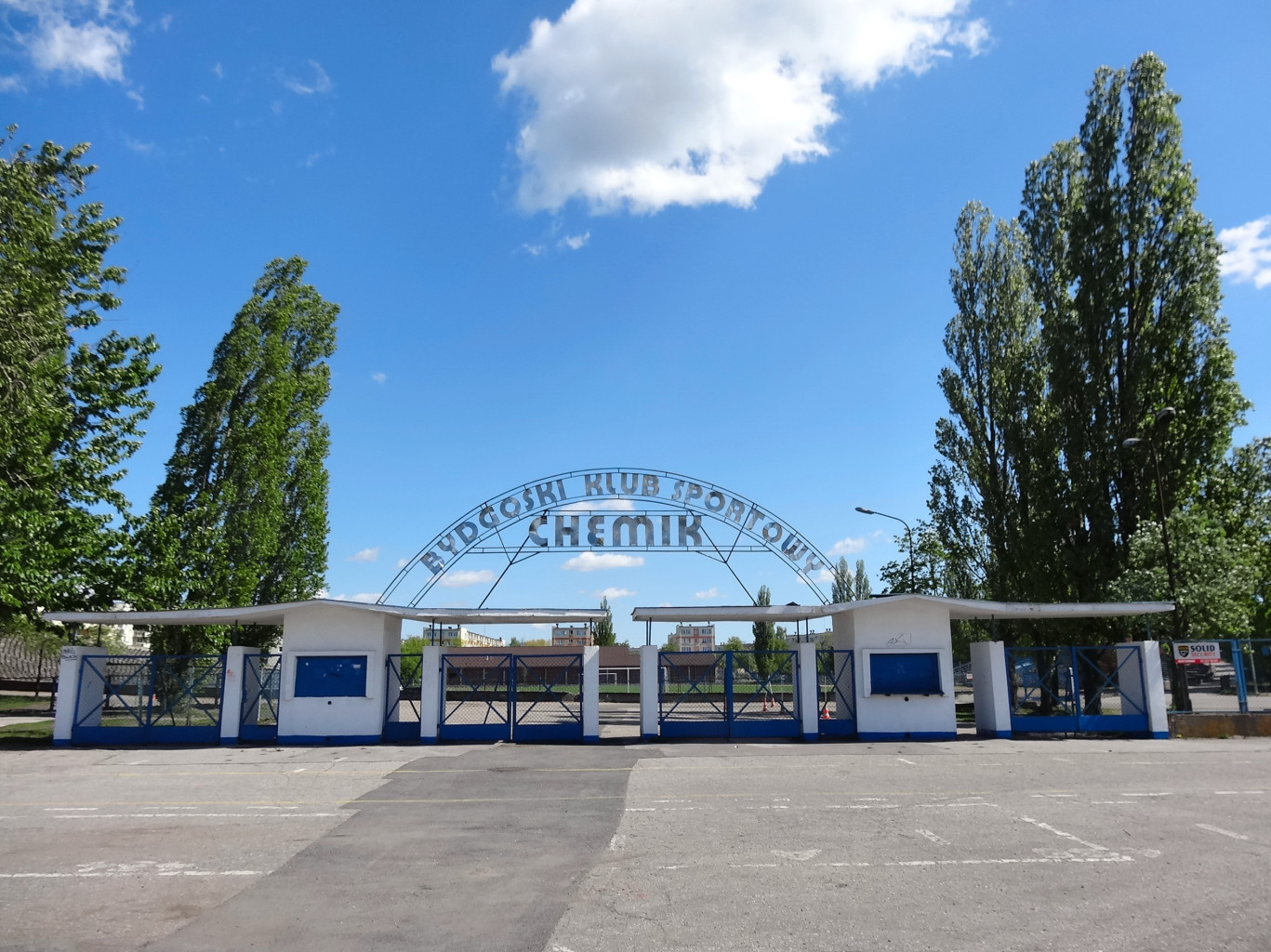
Entrance of the "Chemik stadium"

The new club offered to practice the following disciplines: boxing, athletics, football, volleyball for women and men, shooting and water sports.

In 1960, the name was changed to "Gryf Bydgoszcz" and in 1969 to "KS Zachem Bydgoszcz". On 30 January 1976, another new naming was adopted, Bydgoszcz Sports Club Chemik together with the club's colors: white, blue and red.

In 2007, the volleyball team parted from the Chemik club by becoming a joint-stock company, "Łuczniczka Bydgoszcz", funded by BKS Chemik and the city of Bydgoszcz. Playing in the Polish elite male division (PlusLiga), the team harbored the name of consecutive sponsors: "Delecta Bydgoszcz" (2007–2013), "Transfer Bydgoszcz" (2013–2015), "Łuczniczka Bydgoszcz" (2015–2018), "Chemik Bydgoszcz" (2018–2019), "BKS Visła Bydgoszcz" (2019–2021) and "BKS Visła Proline Bydgoszcz" since 2021.

== Pollution ==
In the 1970s and 1980s, Zachem plant emitted 70 different gaseous substances into the atmosphere, at the rate of 1300 tons per year.

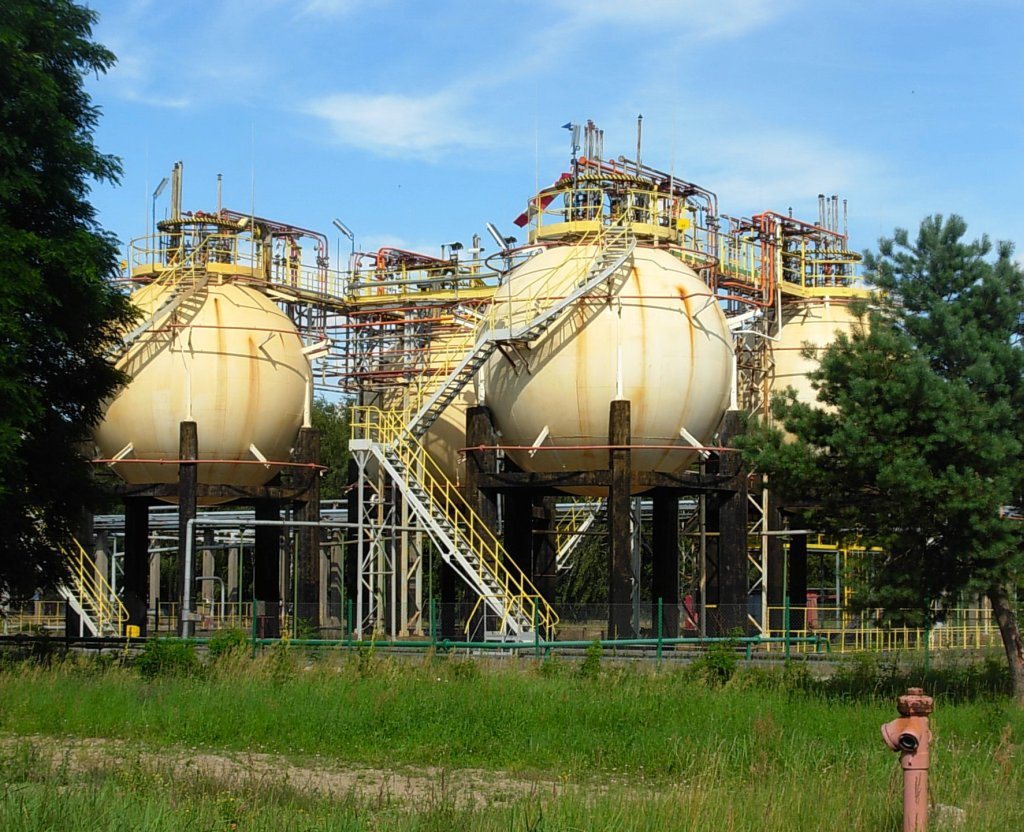
Zachem installations dismantled in 2020

Several evidence of the polluting activity could be found at the time:

- the dirty water from the dyes department was discharged in a cascade stream to settling tanks in Łęgnowo. By the color of the water, you could even tell which dye was in production;
- around the phenol plant, pines were dying;
- in the synthesis department, chlorine and phenol were leaking out of the installation, killing the birds in the surroundings.

In 1990, Zachem was listed in Poland among the "80 most harmful plants to the environment". It was removed from this category in 2001, after carrying out many investments for the protection of nature, which help to reducing sewage and waste by 80% and atmospheric pollution by 73%. The company's largest green investment occurred in 2001: the construction of "Kapuściska", a wastewater treatment plant in Bydgoszcz.

After the Zachem's bankruptcy, two bodies have been performing analyses of the environment surrounding the liquidated plants, Krakow's University of Science and Technology (from 2011 to 2012) and the "Regional Directorate for Environmental Protection" (from 2015). According to their conclusions, the land of the former factories was in 2018 one of the most polluted industrial areas in the world.

=== Hazardous sites ===
Both agencies identified around 18 zones from which pollutants may still seep into the ground and the groundwater. The 11 hectares (27 acres) Zielona landfill was considered the most dangerous source of pollution: there, tens of thousands of tons of phenolic sulfite have been stored directly into the ground, and in the vicinity, the level of phenol present in water exceeds more than 150,000 times the standards.

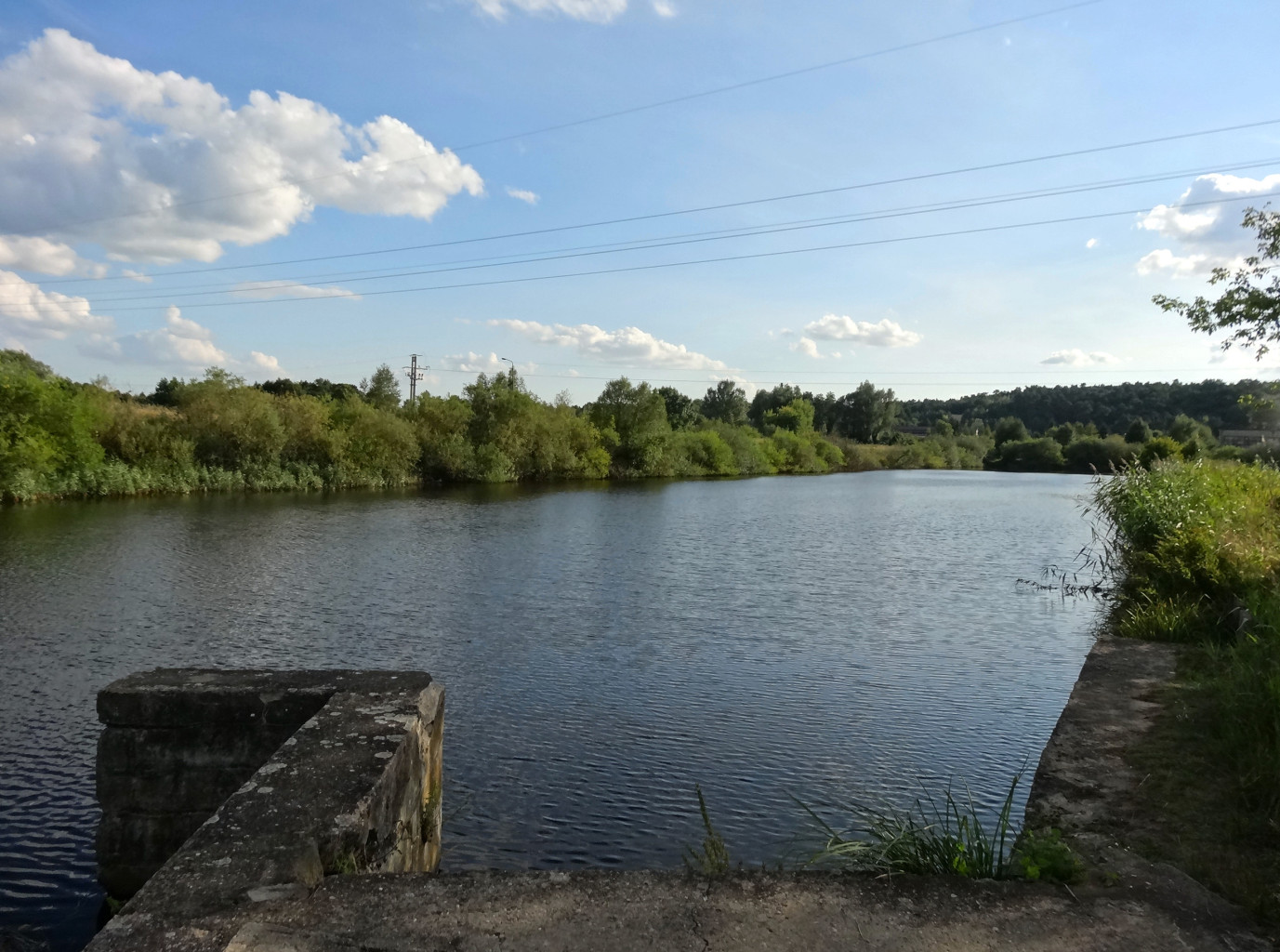
EPI waste landfill, ca 2014

Other hazardous sources of pollution have been identified:

- the Lisia landfill, two concrete tanks, 500 m long, 20 m wide and 3 m deep, covering an area of ca. 1 hectare (2.5 acres);
- the EPI waste landfill, a 3 hectares (7.4 acres) concrete pond, built in 1977, filled with sedimentary byproducts of epichlorohydrin. The brine sludge discharged into the pond of the landfill had increased the pH of the surrounding water from 7.4–7.7 to 11.3–11.5;
- the area around the heap yard and the post-aniline sludge settling tanks. There have been stored brine sludges, ashes and slags from the power plants;
- the contaminated land in the vicinity of the plants which used to manufacture nitrobenzene, toluenediamine (TDA), toluene diisocyanate (TDI) and dinitro (DNT). The pollutants from these areas (mainly phenol, aniline and toluidine) are oozing at the rate of 20 meters per year, then dissolve into underground waters towards the Vistula and Brda rivers, causing a potential major ecological threat to the housing estates of the Łęgnowo district.

To this day, samples from the ex-Zachem areas have been carrying toxic and carcinogenic substances, such as toluene, nitrobenzene, naphthalene, anthracene, pyrene and fluorene. Furthermore, the area of the EPI waste landfill is polluted with both inorganic and organic elements of carcinogenic, mutagenic and toxic natures (phenols, nitrobenzene, toluidine, nitrotoluene). In particular, a 2008 study showed that chlorides have contaminated the groundwater of the Quaternary aquifer.

The complex of landfills was sold by the justice to a private entrepreneur. However, no intake barrier had been put in place in 2014, allowing an uncontrolled flow of pollutants to percolate out. In 2016, the "Regional Directorate for Environmental Protection" (RDOŚ) imposed in court an obligation to install it, along with regular soil, ground and water tests: this decision was revoked by the General Director for Environmental Protection in 2017. In 2018, RDOŚ demanded preventive measures to be carried out in the area of the Zielona landfill. According to the Krakow University of Science and Technology, a solution would be to build sarcophagi surrounding the landfill for a cost estimated at 2 billion PLN. It has been assessed that pollutants leaking from the Zielona landfill could have contaminated an approximative area of 300 hectares (740 acres).

The Żółwin incineration area has been identified as another likely polluted place. Active for decades since 1950, post-production waste used to be disposed of there by burning in pits dug in the ground. The date of closure of the site is not known precisely, as well as the exact nature of the waste processed during its operating period.

=== Cleaning ===
In 2018, a project to clean up the former Zachem site was approved: the scheme should last till 2023 and 93.4 million PLN were allocated for this aim, of which 85% comes from EU funds.

A 2019, study estimated the cost of the de-pollution of the entire site at 2.6 billion PLN (580 million dollar based on DEC 2022 exchange rate).

In 2021, the Polish-French consortium "Remea" ("Remea Sp. z.o.o." and "Menard Group SA"), started the construction of a facility for the rehabilitation of ex-Zachem polluted areas. The installation will protect the Łęgnowo district till 2023, preventing the spread of pollutants leaking from the "Zielona landfill". Additionally, the process will clean toxic substances off the soil and the groundwater in a 26 hectares (64 acres) area. The entire remediation project costs 90 million PLN. The works, however, started with more than one year of delay.

== See also ==
- Large-scale chemical synthesis in Poland
- Soil contamination

== Bibliography ==
- Umiński, Janusz (2014). Fabryka, jakich niewiele. Kalendarz Bydgoski [A factory like no other. Bydgoszcz calendar] (in Polish). Bydgoszcz: Towarzystwo Miłośników Miasta Bydgoszczy. pp. 33–35.
