= Large-scale chemical synthesis in Poland =

Industrial sector of Poland

The chemical companies of the large-scale chemical synthesis in Poland (Polish: Wielka synteza chemiczna) at the beginning of the 21st century, underwent the a process of intensive reorganization.

== History ==
Since the majority of entities in the sector of great chemical synthesis was owned by State Treasury at that time, the reorganisation and privatisation strategy was developed for the sector of great chemical synthesis.

It identified, e.g. weak connections between the particular production plants and the necessity to reorganise them. The effect of this strategy was, e.g. the consolidation of the chemical and fertiliser industry, by establishing Grupa Azoty.

== Polish chemical plants ==
The results of the 'great chemical synthesis' — the largest chemical plants in Poland — include:

- Grupa Azoty S.A. (former Zakłady Azotowe in Tarnów-Mościce), seated in Tarnów and with profit of PLN 10.0 million in 2015.
- Grupa Azoty PULAWY (former Zakłady Azotowe „Puławy" S.A.): with profit of PLN 3.69 million in 2015; the group includes, e.g. plants in Puławy, Zakłady Azotowe in Chorzów, „Fosfory" Phosphoric Fertiliser Plants in Gdańsk,
- Grupa Azoty POLICE (former Zakłady Chemiczne „Police" S.A.) with profit of PLN 2.55 million in 2015,
- Grupa Azoty ZAK in Kędzierzynie-Koźlu (former Zakłady Azotowe in Kędzierzyn-Koźle; ZAK S.A.) with profit of PLN 1.75 million in 2015,
- Grupa Azoty SIARKOPOL seated in Grzybów.
- Anwil, a part of PKN Orlen concern (Zakłady Azotowe in Włocławek),
- CIECH: with profit of PLN 100 million.
- CIECH Pianki (former Zakłady Chemiczne „Zachem S.A"), seated in Bydgoszcz,
- CIECH Sarzyna S.A. (former Zakłady Chemiczne Organika-Sarzyna S.A.), seated in Nowa Sarzyna,
- CIECH Soda Polska S.A., incorporated in: zakłady sodowe w Janikowie i Inowrocławiu,
- CIECH Vitrosilicon S.A., plants in Żory and Iłowa.

In addition:

- Elana Toruń S.A. in Toruń incorporated in Boryszew Capital Group.
- Synthos S.A., including chemical plants in Oświęcim.
- Alwernia S.A. (former Zakłady Chemiczne Alwernia S.A.) in Alwernia.
- Zakłady Chemiczne Siarkopol S.A. in Tarnobrzeg.
- Zakłady Chemiczne Rudniki S.A., in Rudniki.
- Zakłady Chemiczne Luboń S.A. in Luboń, incorporated in Luvena Capital Group S.A.
- PCC Rokita S.A. from Brzeg Dolny.
- Zakłady Włókien Chemicznych Stilon S.A. in Gorzów Wielkopolski.
- BASF Polska.

== See also ==
- Chemical companies of Poland
- Chemical industry in Poland
