= Box mangle =

Laundry smoothing device

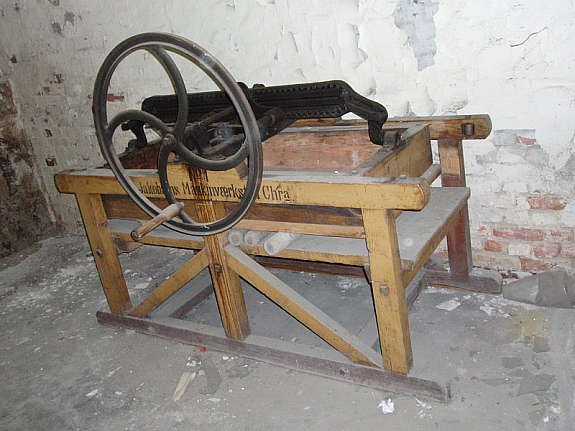
Box mangle Found in a laundry cellar in Oslo

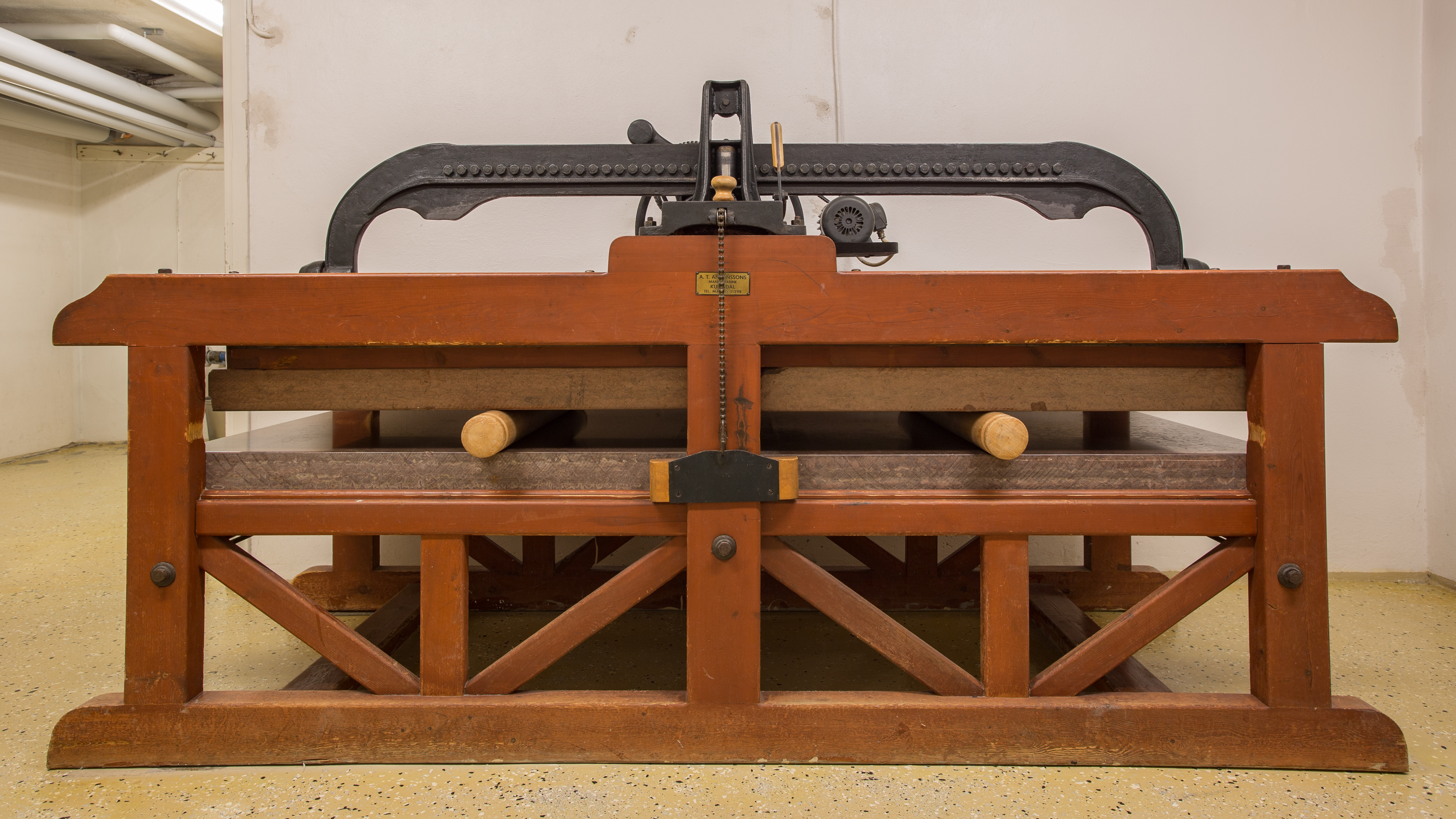
Electrified box mangle with solid stone plates over and under the rolls (also called stone mangle).

The box mangle is said to have been invented in the 17th century. It consisted of a heavy frame containing a large box filled with rocks, resting on a series of long wooden rollers. Damp laundry could be laid flat under rollers, or wound round the rollers: sometimes enclosed in a sheet in order to keep the laundry clean. When the rollers were filled, one or two people pulled on levers or turned cranks to move the heavy box back and forth over the rollers. The mangle's primary purpose was to press household linen and clothing smooth.

This was a mechanical version of the hand-held mangle boards and rollers/pins used in many parts of northern Europe. Nowadays the word mangle suggests a wringing device for removing water from laundry in some English-speaking countries, but the box mangle was used for pressing and smoothing, and was an alternative to hot ironing for larger items. Flat items, like sheets and tablecloths, usually needed no further ironing.

The box mangle was a large and expensive affair and required a fair bit of labor to operate it. It was often used by very large households, commercial laundries or by self-employed mangle women who served their local area. In the 19th century new designs made it easier to operate, and before the middle of the century the upright, space-saving type with cloth pressed between two rollers had become familiar.

In the late 19th century the commercial steam laundry replaced the box mangle with the steam mangle, turned by steam power.
