= Mengler =

Mengler is a surname. Notable people with the surname include:

- Jacqui Mengler, Australian sprint canoer who competed in the late 1990s
- Thomas Mengler, expert in procedure and complex litigation

== See also ==
- Mengler Hill (formerly Mengler's Hill), a hill in the Barossa Ranges, and one of the most popular lookouts in the Barossa Valley in the state of South Australia
