= Mangel, Nigeria =

Mangel
- Village
- Location within Nigeria
- Coordinates: 07°01′N 008°56′E
- Country: Nigeria
- State: Benue
- Time zone: UTC+1 (WAT)

Mangel is a village in the Vandeikya LGA, Benue State, of Nigeria, West Africa. It is located on the River Undiel and occupied by members of the Tiv people who speak the Tiv language.
