= Mangle (machine) =

Mechanical laundry aid

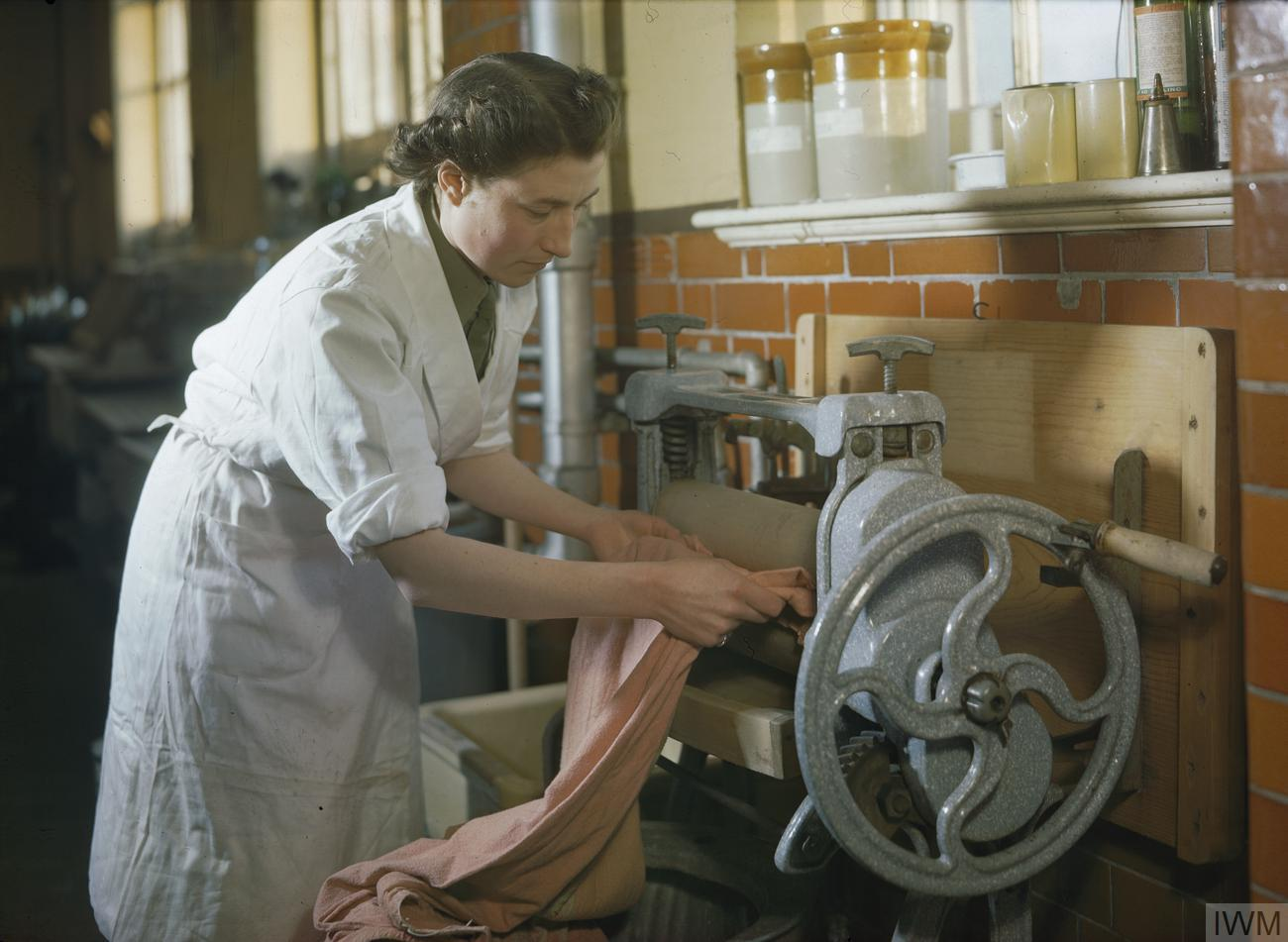
A mangle being used in a domestic science course during World War II

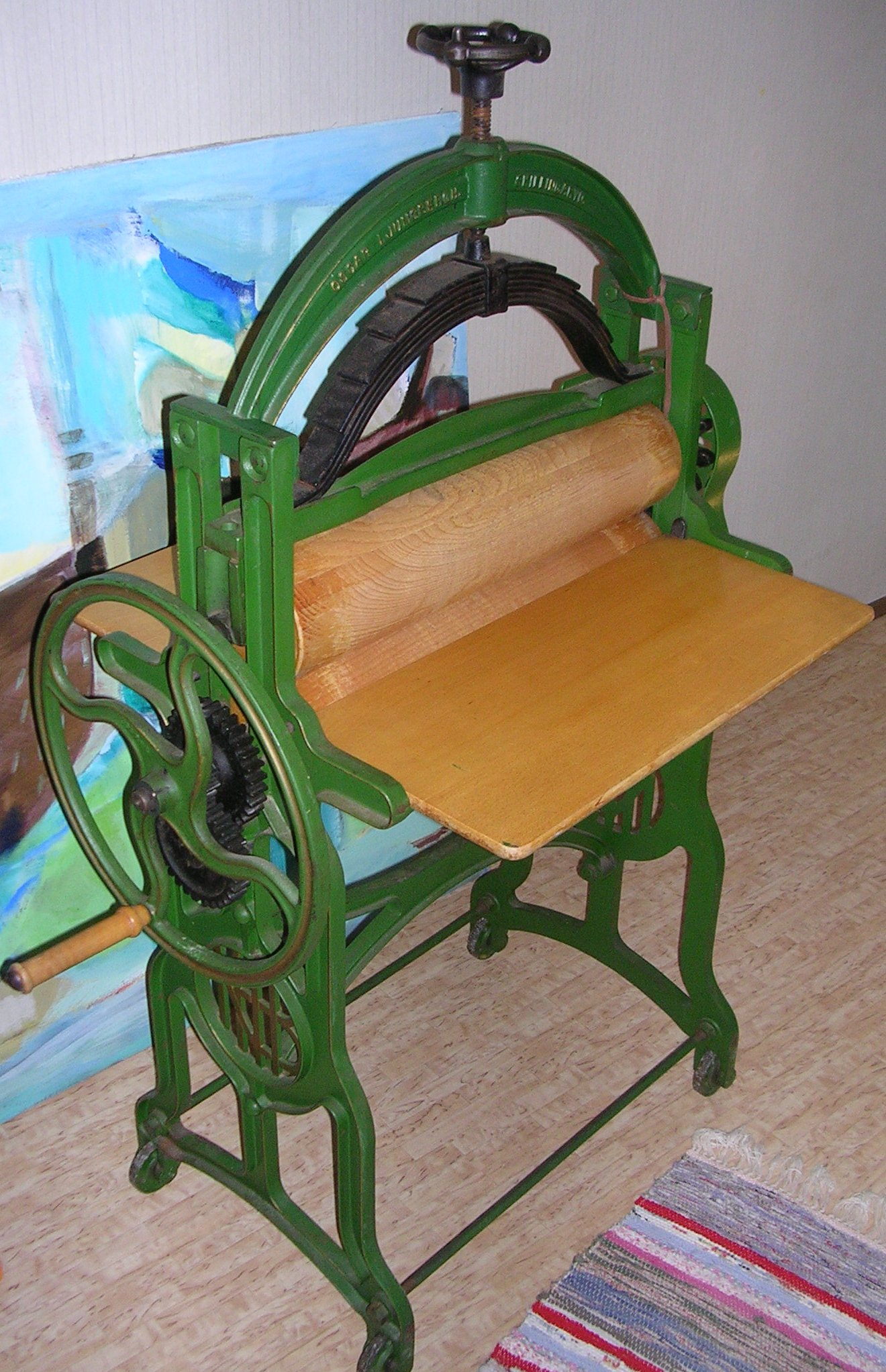
A Norrahammars Bruk, model 3005-2, mangle from 1934

A mangle is a mechanical laundry aid consisting of two rollers in a sturdy frame, connected by cogs and, in its home version, powered by a hand crank or by electricity.

Mangles are used to press or flatten sheets, tablecloths, kitchen towels, or clothing and other laundry. A wringer is a smaller lighter machine of similar appearance and function and was used to squeeze the water out of wet washing. While mangles remain in use in commercial settings, wringers have been made redundant by the spin dry cycle on modern washing machines.

== History ==
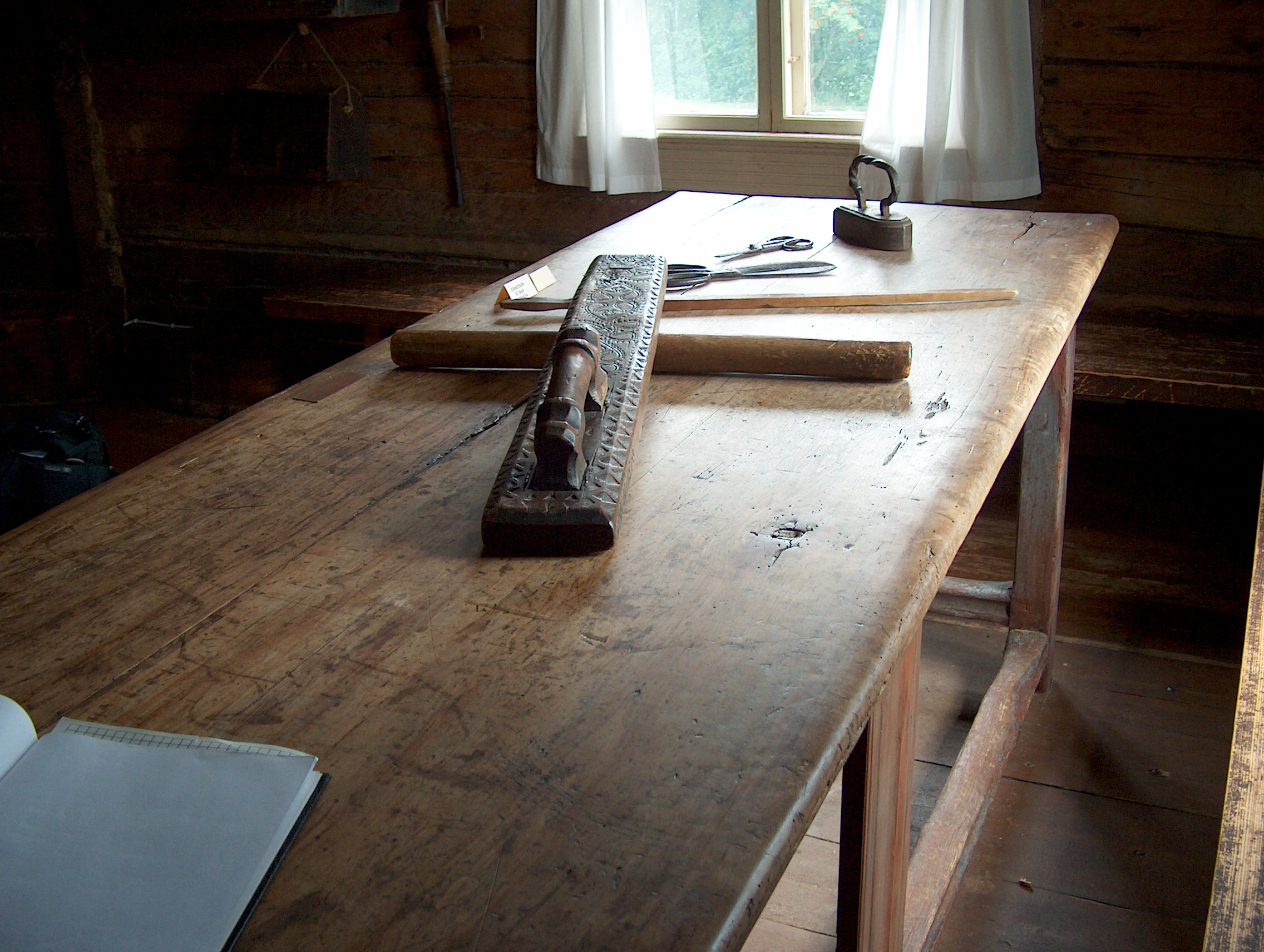
A primitive mangle at the childhood home of Aleksis Kivi in Palojoki, Nurmijärvi, Finland, pictured in 2005

=== Clothes press ===
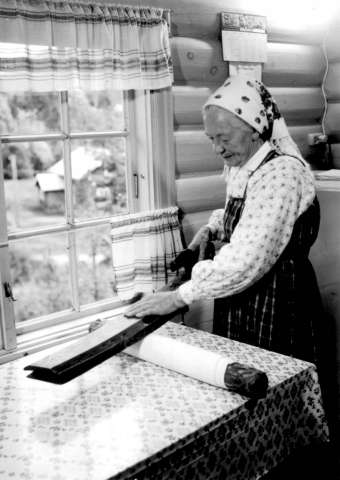
With the dominant hand on the handle and the other hand on the mangle, the user presses on the roll while it is pushed back and forth. Photo: Norwegian Folk Museum, 1962.

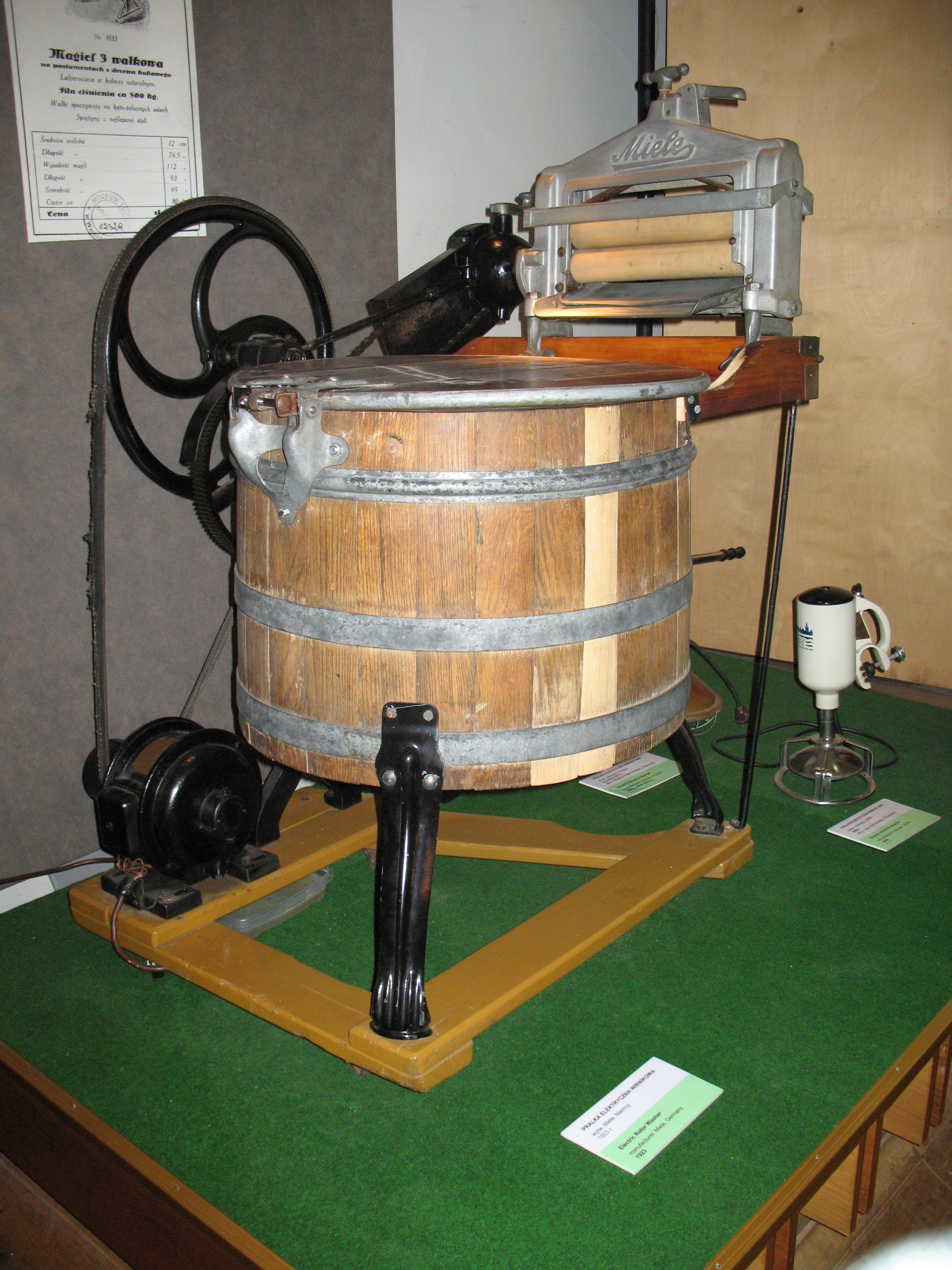
A 1923 electric Miele washing machine with a built-in wringer

The Oxford English Dictionary dates the first use of the word mangle in English from 1598, quoting John Florio who, in his 1598 dictionary, A World of Words, described "a kind of press to press buckram, fustian, or dyed linen cloth, to make it have a luster or gloss". The word comes from the Dutch mangel, from mangelen "to mangle", which in turn derives from the medieval Latin mango or manga which ultimately comes from the Greek manganon, meaning "axis" or "engine" (particularly the mangonel).

Some northern European countries used a table version for centuries, the device consisting of the rolling pin, a wood cylinder around which the damp cloth was wrapped, and the mangle board, a curved or flat length of wood which was used to roll and flatten the cloth. The oldest known model is a Norwegian mangle board, found near Bergen and dated 1444.

In the second half of the 19th century, commercial laundries began using steam-powered mangles or ironers. Gradually, the electric washing machine's spin cycle rendered this use of a mangle obsolete, and with it the need to wring out water from clothes mechanically. Box mangles were large and primarily intended for pressing laundry smooth; they were used by wealthy households, large commercial laundries, and self-employed "mangle women". Middle-class households and independent washerwomen used upright mangles for wringing water out of laundry, and in the later 19th century they were more widely used than early washing machines. The rollers were typically made of wood, or sometimes rubber.

The Steel Roll Mangle Co. of 108 Franklin Street, Chicago, Illinois, offered a gas-heated home mangle for pressing linens in 1902. In the 1930s electric mangles were developed and are still a feature of many laundry rooms. They consist of a rotating padded drum which revolves against a heating element which can be stationary, or can also be a rotating drum. Laundry is fed into the turning mangle and emerges flat and pressed on the other side. This process takes much less time than ironing with the usual iron and ironing board.

There were many electric rotary ironers on the American market including Solent, Thor, Ironrite and Apex. By the 1940s the list had grown to include Bendix, General Electric, Kenmore and Maytag. By the 1950s, home ironers, or mangles, as they came to be called, were becoming popular time-savers for the homemaker.

=== Drying clothes ===
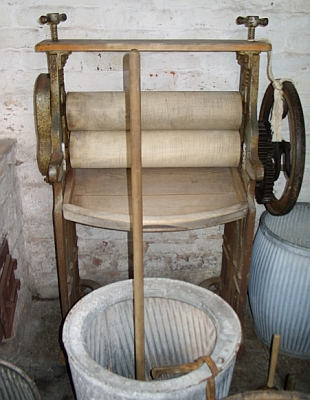
Mangle on display at the Apprentice House at the Quarry Bank Mill in the UK

When home washing machines were first invented, they were just for washing: a tub on legs or wheels. A hand-cranked mangle appeared on top after 1843 when John E. Turnbull of Saint John, New Brunswick, patented a "Clothes Washer With Wringer Rolls". The first geared wringer mangle in the UK is thought to date to about 1850, when one was invented by Robert Tasker of Lancashire. It was a smaller, upright version of the box mangle.

== Current use ==
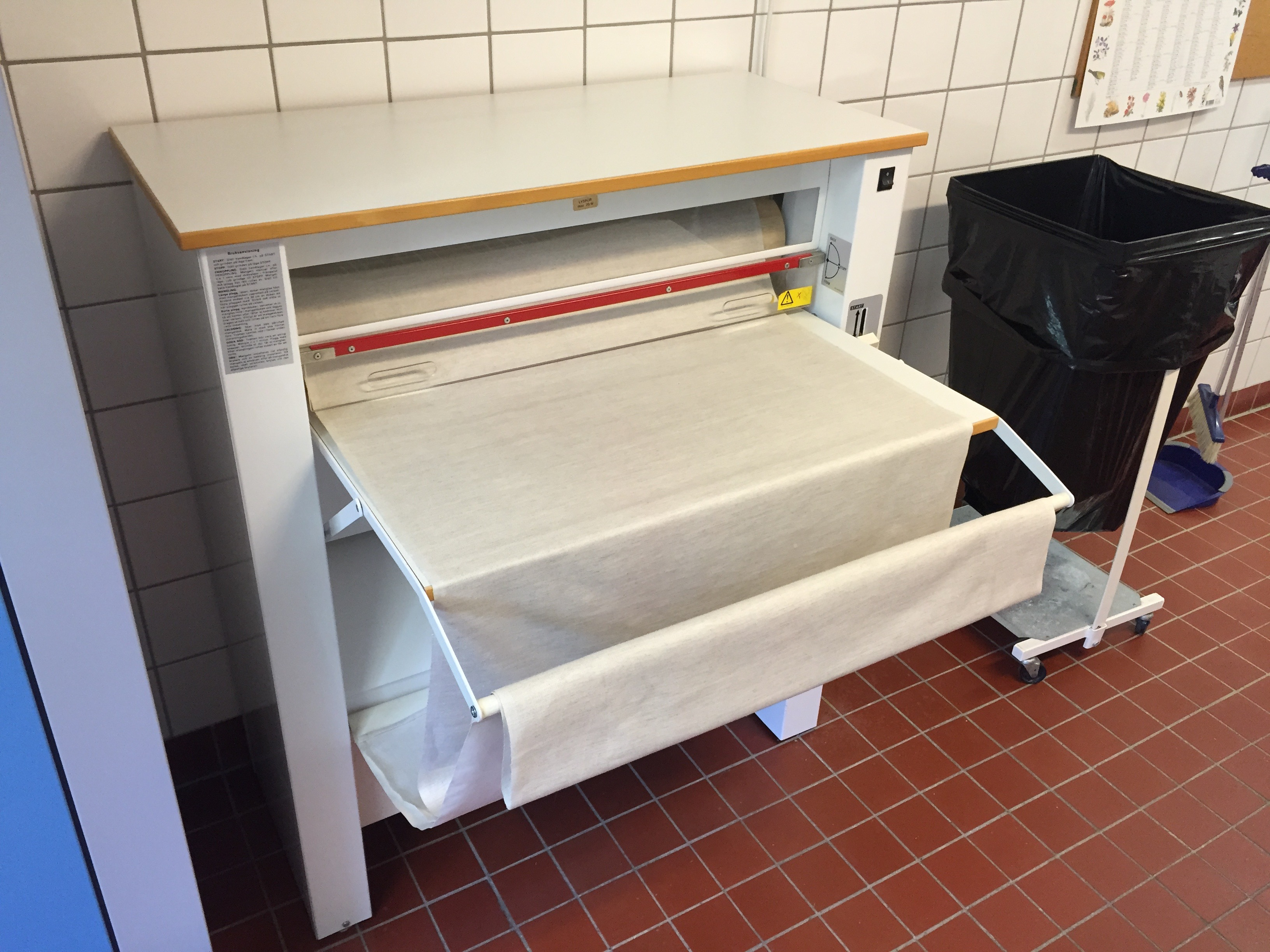
A modern, motorized mangle in a residential building's laundry room in Sweden

Small domestic pressing mangles may be more common in some countries than in others. They are typically not sold in North American stores. In contrast to their use in homes, mangles have become an essential feature of commercial or large-scale laundries. They are typically used to press flat items such as sheets or tablecloths, and also are far quicker and more energy-efficient for removing most of the water than a clothes dryer. Skilled operators can also press shirts and trousers on a mangle.

A significant benefit of mangling is reduced dust. When washing, the ends of the surface fibers tend to loosen and stick out when dried. The clothes are then much more sensitive to trap dust, dirt and grease, and to shed off fibers. Mangling presses the fiber ends back onto the fiber, so that the clothes remain clean longer. This could potentially reduce dust approximately 10 to 60 times; however, this is not confirmed. Mangles are most often used for bed sheets, tablecloths and towels, which would be time-consuming to iron by hand.

=== Artistic use ===
Artists, such as Barbara Brash have adapted mangles to serve as printing presses, which they resemble in construction. By fixing a metal platen, on which printing plate and paper are placed, permanently between the rollers, which themselves may be replaced by, or sheathed in, turned metal cylinders; they thus make a serviceable and much less expensive alternative to a commercial cylinder etching press.

== See also ==
- Clothes horse
- Cold pad batch
- List of home appliances
- Ellen Eglin
