= Mościce =

District of Tarnów, Poland

Coordinates: 50.0064°N 20.9247°E

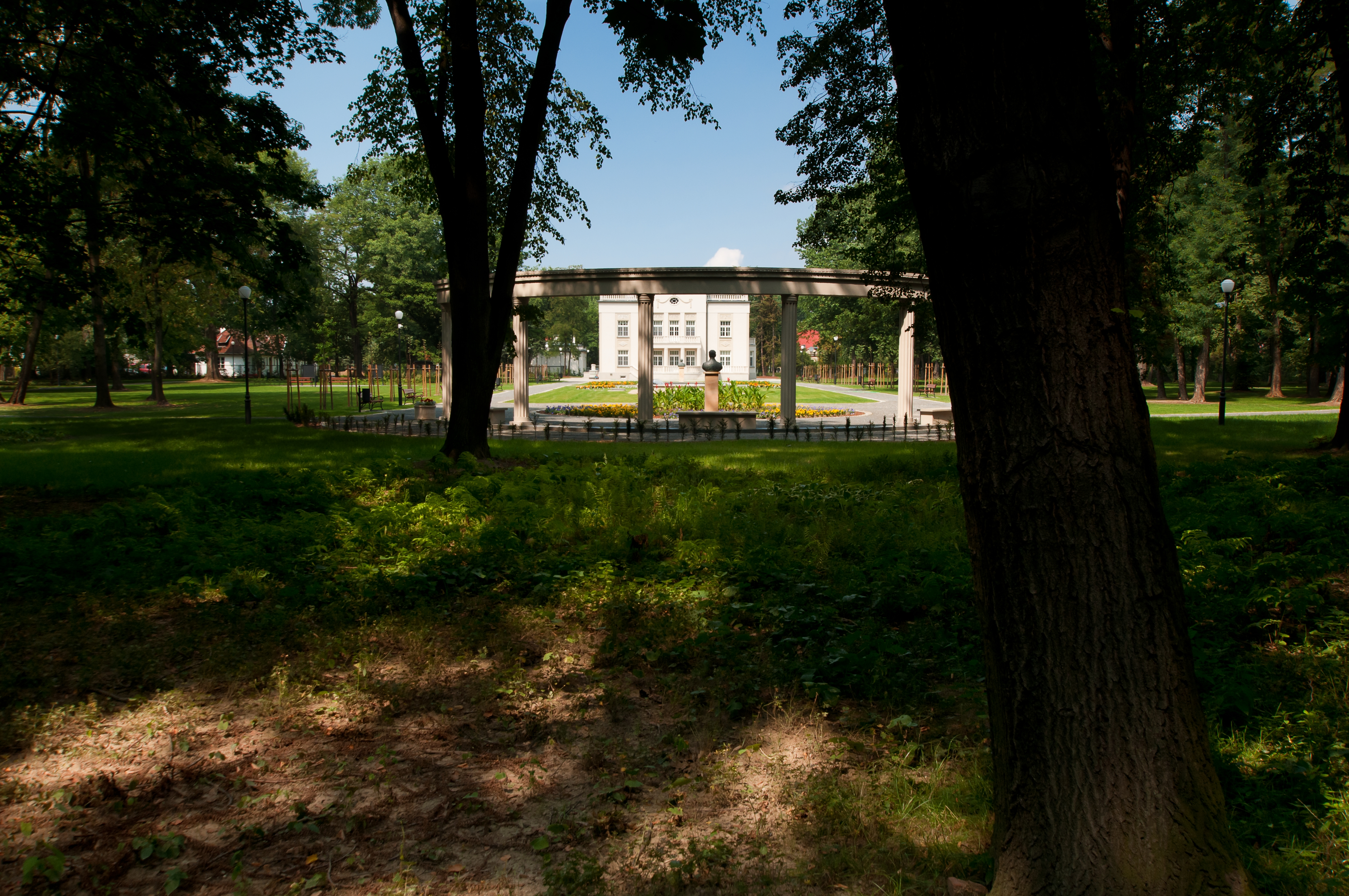
Kwiatkowski Palace in Mościce

Mościce (Polish pronunciation: [mɔɕˈt͡ɕit͡sɛ]) is industrial district of Tarnów, Poland. In the 1920s, there was located the National Factory of Nitric Compounds. Currently, the enterprise operates as Grupa Azoty S.A. and its Capital Group focuses the largest plants of great chemical synthesis in the country that are located in Tarnów, Police, Kędzierzyn-Koźle and Puławy, at the same time, it is the leading producer of mineral fertilisers, construction plasticisers as well as OXO alcohols and plasticisers in Poland and Europe.

The name of the district directly comes from the surname of the initiator of the construction of these plants - chemist, inventor, politician, the president of II Polish Republic in 1926-1939, prof. Ignacy Mościcki. The person of Eugeniusz Kwiatkowski - chemist, minister of industry and commerce, vice-president, minister of State Treasury in the II Polish Republic, who was the director of National Factory of Nitric Acids in Mościce in 1930–1935.

Mościce was designed in such a way so that the residents would not see the negative effects of industrial plant operation, hence, the high number of green strips and the park (garden city).

Currently, Mościce is one of the largest and most important districts in Tarnów. It has a developed sports-leisure infrastructure. The City Stadium, a complex of swimming pools with uncovered Olympic pool, a few football grounds and a sports hall (Jaskółka Hall).

The neighbourhood of the industrial plants results in developing cultural life in Mościce, the example of which is: Mościce Art Centre, where the theatre spectacles are performed as well as numerous concerts are organised.

== History of Mościce ==
- The district was constructed in the territory of Świerczków village and Dąbrówka Infułacka.
- On 12 March 1927 the government decided to build the National Factory of Nitric Acids.
- In May 1927 the construction of “factory housing estate” was started.
- On 29 June 1929 the combined areas of Świerczków and Dąbrówka villages were named Mościce.
- In January 1930 the National Factory of Nitric Acids was officially opened with the participation of the president of Polish Republic Ignacy Mościcki. Its first technical director was Romuald Wowkonowicz.
- In 1931 and 1934 - the establishment of “Nasz Dom” and “Osiedle” co-operatives.
- Mościce commune functioned independently in 1934–1954.
- On 2 June 1934 the erection act for the construction of “Za torem” housing estate was built in with the participation of the president Ignacy Mościcki and bishop Franciszek Lisowski. The main axis of a new housing estate under construction was the present Norwida Street (formerly Jaracza), village built-up with flat roofs characteristic for popular functionalism in that period (“Osiedle” co-operative).
- At the same time, the construction of the common school at Zbylitowska street (post-war “Ósemka”) was started.
- In 1936 the construction of the medical outpatient clinic at Chemiczna and Zbylitowska streets was started, a so-called “na górce” outpatient clinic.
- In the second half of the 30s the “Nasz Dom” Co-operative performed the construction of twin houses.
- The built-up was constructed in the interwar period.
- The characteristic built-up of post-war Mościce: regular (houses according to one project), symmetrical, the same fencings, trees along the streets, toned faced colours.

== Monuments ==
- The bust of Eugeniusz Kwiatkowski, the director of National Factory of Nitric Acids (currently Grupa Azoty) in 1931-1935. The monument shows the portrait view of the character. The bust was placed in the rectangular pedestal with dimensions 126 x 76 cm, The concept refers to the vision of the monument of Eugeniusz Kwiatkowski in Gdynia. The artist which made the pedestal, a sculptor prof. Stanisław Szwechowicz, proposed a kind of a band or ribbon 248 cm long and 110 cm wide, dynamically running through the diagonal, symbolising the Vision and Action which were impersonalised by Eugeniusz Kwiatkowski in the period of II Polish Republic. The bust the width of which is 172 cm, is cast from bronze, whereas, the pedestal is a monolith 216 cm high made of granite block. A so-called pedestal expansion is another 8 cm. It all makes the statue of Eugeniusz Kwiatkowski is a giant personification of the ethos of developing the bases of the Polish industry. The official unveiling of the monument on 9 October 2012 on the day of the celebrations of 85th anniversary of Grupa Azoty S.A. performed the president of Polish Republic Bronisław Komorowski and the granddaughter of Eugeniusz Kwiatkowski Julita Maciejewicz-Ryś.
- Obelisk - the board commemorating the official unveiling of the National Factory of Nitric Acids (currently Grupa Azoty S.A.). The obelisk was unveiled on 18 January 1930 with the participation of the president of Polish Republic, representatives of the government and bishop Leon Wałęga. When the German occupied the factory in September 1939, two workers decided to hide the board. During the disassembly it broke into ca. 10 pieces. The workers kept them until 1989. On 12 October 1990 a copy of the historical board, built-in the rectangular pedestal placed there was hollowed and officially unveiled in front of the administration building of Azoty in Tarnów. The original incomplete board is in the museum collection of Grupa Azoty S.A. Due to its immaterial value, the exhibit is not available to visitors.
- The busts of Eugeniusz Kwiatkowski and Ignacy Mościcki in the Park named after E. Kwiatkowski. The busts of the architects of the interwar industry are ca. 68 cm high. The statues were made of bronze and placed on ca. 160 cm sandstone monoliths. The park around the Kwiatkowski Villa - one of the most beautiful palaces in Tarnów - was chosen as their location. The bust of Eugeniusz Kwiatkowski can also be found inside the villa. In the residential hall, where the director Kwiatkowski lived in 1931-1935, there is almost a 160 cm entablement on which there is the bust of one of the most honoured politicians of the interwar period. The bust the height of which is ca. 60 cm is made of bronze. The author of the project and the performer of the bust is prof. Stanisław Szwechowicz an artist sculptor. The bust was unveiled in 2012.
- The stone commemorating the built-in of the erection act for the construction of the “Za torem” housing estate was unveiled in 1934. Due to efforts of the residents of the “Za torem” housing estate a monument-stone was placed in the site where the erection act was built-in to commemorate the fact of construction of the housing estate and 80th anniversary of the regained independence.
- The statue of Grey Rank scoutmaster, Wincenty Mucha in the eponymous park. It is made of granite stone, irregular in shape and placed on a concrete plinth which was erected in 1998. There is a marble plaque on the stone with the scout cross carved on the left and the scouting oath to the right. The project was conceived by Edward Kupiniak. The monument was erected on the initiative of the Mościce and Grey Rank Soldiers Housing Estate.
- Monument-Grey Rank Mausoleum. The monument is made of the foundation under the obelisk and the plate with four boards. On the first of them it is written “Died fighting with the Hitler occupant in 1939-1945”, on the next ones there are named, surnames, pseudonimes and age of the diseased. The remaining parts of the monument are two pillars with convex elements, behind which there is a concave wall with the quote from the text by Mieczysław Jastrun “What will become the history book... you wrote with blood and hope”. The project was performed by Jacek Sumara and the producers were Zakłady Azotowe in Tarnów (currently Grupa Azoty S.A.) and Chemobudowa. The official monument unveiling was on 30 September 1975. Upon political changes in 1989, the cross (based on the papal one) was placed on the pillars and the reliefs were placed on the decorative elements: White Eagle, Scout's Badge, the sign of Fighting Poland and Military Eagle of 1944.
- The spatial forms acc. to Dagarama's vision. Four spatial forms made by Marcin Zarzeka in 2011 are inspired by these which were created upon Biennale of Spatial Forms in 1965 and 1967. At the same time, they are the copies of construction projects of architect-visioner Jan Głuszak Dagarama.
- The spatial form of Wilhelm Sasnal. It is a pyramid made of 14 concrete circles connected with cement. Inside one of them there is date 28 March 1983 which symbolises “the threat that never took place”. The sculpture is placed on the right side of Tarnów-Mościce Railway Station. The “off-the-way” place was chosen on purpose as according to the designer's vision, the statue should be hidden, surrounded by trees and bushes and, with time, forgotten. The spatial form of Wilhelm Sasnal was unveiled on 28 August 2010.

== Historical buildings ==
- Kwiatkowski Villa (formerly Chemist House) - the facility located at 9 Jarzębinowa Street. It has the status of the cultural weal entered to the monument register under the decision of the Voivodship Monument Conservator of 17 December 1979. The villa-garden complex is situated in two lots within 192 m2, lot no. 27/13 with surface of 10,779 m² and lot no. 27/21 with surface of 19.412 m². The building is located in the surrounding of the Park named after Eugeniusz Kwiatkowski (surface 8.34 ha) covered by conservator's protection of 21 July 2006. Kwiatkowski villa was built in 1927–1928 acc. to project of Konrad Kłos architect. The construction was performed by Construction Office of engineer Antoni Kiełbasiński and Company. It was made in the modernistic style, referring to neoclassicism. It is a detached, one-storey, three-axial, two-bay building partly cellared with originally roof void, based on a rectangular shape with eastern jutty. The Palace usable area – ca. 320 m², premises – ca. 180 m², cubage – 1,260 m3. The facade of Kwiatkowski villa: breaks with four-pillar porticos; cornice with banister balustrade, stone vases in the corners. North facade - front one is regular, five-axial, with small concave portico, hemispherical balcony on the first floor with banister balustrade, supported with four columns. In turn, the south, garden facade has regular nature, five-axial, big hemispherical terrace open to the park, with fan-shaped stairs and with a rectangular balcony on the first floor supported with pillars. Originally, Kwiatkowski Villa functioned as a comfortable company flat with a garden for the first main directors of the National Factory of Nitric Compounds in Mościce. Eugeniusz Kwiatkowski, during his visit, stayed in this villa. Before World War II the building was a representational hotel. During war, it was the headquarters of the German main director of the factory and Feldgericht the German military summary court. Upon war, its rooms were used by e.g. ZHP team in Mościce, Plant Council, Voivodship National Council, City National Council, Association for Promoting Physical Activity, Retiree and Pensioner Club, SITPChem Association of Engineers and Technical Engineers in Chemical Industry, Plant Division of Polish Touristic-Landscape Community, touristic equipment rental, division of Tadeusz Kościuszko Kraków University of Technology, division of AGH University of Science and Technology, Commerce Department of Zakłady Azotowe in Tarnów-Mościce, Licence Department of Zakłady Azotowe in Tarnów-Mościce as well as ONT Export Office and Technical Support Office of Zakłady Azotowe in Tarnów-Mościce. The general overhaul of the palace-garden complex was in 2010-2011. Currently, Kwiatkowski villa has a representative function. The owner of the estate is Grupa Azoty S.A.
- “Kasyno” restaurant - the public building complex constructed in 1936-1938. The facility was erected in the modernistic style in an axial, symmetrical composition, it consists of the main building and two side wings with the yard and park in the south side. At first, the building was an office casino for employees of the State Nitric Compounds Factory in Mościce (currently Grupa Azoty S.A.). On 15 November 1947 a plant recreation room was opened in the villa where the spectacles of hobby theatre group were performed. in 1956 “New Casino”, since the building was called this way, started to serve the function of a community centre, hence, the other name “old Community Centre”. The building functioned as the cultural institution in the 1950s. Next, it was transformed into a gastronomical facility (the main building). In side wings there are the seats of, e.g. PTTK Azoty Club, HDK Club named after Tytus Chałubiński at Grupa Azoty S.A., division of Association of Engineers and Chemists from Chemical Industry in Tarnów, division of emergency services. The facility is located at 20 Kwiatkowskiego Street.
- “Old Casino” - the building constructed in 1929 at the commission of the Farming Club Warehouse in Mościce at current 16 Chemiczna Street. In the 1950s Azot cinema has its seat in the “Old Casino”. [2l] At present, the seat of the Tarnów division of the National Archive in Krakóww is located in the facility. The works to adapt the building to serve a new function were performed in 1985-1991.
- The stone benches - six-metre, oval stone benches cast from artificial sandstone are located in the south side of Topolowa street. The benches from 1929 “have gently filleted seats and supports decorated with stone spheres. Their material and form indicate that they were created around 1930 in the spirit of the Polish type of modernism, combining the modernity of forms and materials with the tradition of classical architecture and garden art from the break of XVIII and XIX century”.

== Industry ==
Grupa Azoty, based in Mościce, is the largest group in the Great Chemical Synthesis sector in Poland as well as one of the key holdings in the chemical sector in Europe. The history of the Plants reaches 1927 when the government on the initiative of the president of Polish Republic Ignacy Mościcki made decision allowing for the construction of the National Factory of Nitric Compounds near Tarnów. The establishment of Mościce is also connected with its establishment - that was the name of combined areas of Świerczków and Dąbrówka Infułacka villages in 1929, on the territory of which the investment was completed.

The National Factory of Nitric Compounds was opened in 1930 and in 1933 it was merged with the National Factory of Nitric Compounds in Chorzów. The director of the enterprise in Mościce, Eugeniusz Kwiatkowski was the leader of the United Factories of Nitric Compounds in Mościce and Chorzów.

The National Factory of Nitric Compounds was one of the key and the largest investments of interwar period in Poland, functioning in the scope of Central Industrial District. During world war II, the German took hold of the enterprise which operated under the name Stickstoffwerke Moscice.

After the war, the factory restarted its activity in 1948. In the 1950s, the company operated to a 6-year economic plan. Further development and modernisation of the enterprise occurred in the 1960s, 70s and 80s. In 1991 the plants were transformed into a joint-stock S.A. company of the State Treasury.

In the period of re-investment (2001-2007) and unsuccessful attempts of privatisation (2001), on 5 March 2006 the management board of Zakłady Azotowe in Tarnów-Mościce S.A. (currently Grupa Azoty S.A.) decided to enter the Warsaw Stock Exchange. From a time perceptive, the company debut on the Stock Exchange on 30 June 2008 turned out to be “spiritus movens” not only for its further development, but also for consolidation of the Polish chemical industry. In May 2010 the Grupa Azoty took on the function of the Polish chemical industry consolidator. In 2014 the process of integration of two largest Polish chemical plants was completed. Thus the Grupa Azoty Capital Group was established, with the dominant unit, Grupa Azoty S.A. based in Tarnów. Grupa Azoty includes other businesses such as Grupa Azoty POLICE, Grupa Azoty PUŁAWY, Grupa Azoty ZAK, Grupa Azoty SIARKOPOL and foreign acquisitions allowed to also include a German company Grupa Azoty ATT Polymers GmbH in the portfolio. Currently, the Grupa Azoty incorporates or is associated with over fifty other entities where it is a minority capital shareholder.

Grupa Azoty is included in the following indices WIG, WIG30, mWIG 40, WIG-Poland, WIG-CHEMIA, Respect Index of the Warsaw Stock Exchange as well as International MSCI Emerging Markets and the FTSE Global Equity Index Series Emerging Markets.
