= Polymer engineering =

Engineering field studying polymer materials

Polymer engineering is generally an engineering field that designs, analyses, and modifies polymer materials. Polymer engineering covers aspects of the petrochemical industry, polymerization, structure and characterization of polymers, properties of polymers, compounding and processing of polymers and description of major polymers, structure property relations and applications.

== History ==
The word “polymer” was introduced by the Swedish chemist J. J. Berzelius. He considered, for example, benzene (C_{6}H_{6}) to be a polymer of ethyne (C_{2}H_{2}). Later, this definition underwent a subtle modification.

The history of human use of polymers has been long since the mid-19th century, when it entered the chemical modification of natural polymers. In 1839, Charles Goodyear found a critical advance in the research of rubber vulcanization, which has turned natural rubber into a practical engineering material. In 1870, J. W. Hyatt uses camphor to plasticize nitrocellulose to make nitrocellulose plastics industrial. 1907 L. Baekeland reported the synthesis of the first thermosetting phenolic resin, which was industrialized in the 1920s, the first synthetic plastic product. In 1920, H. Standinger proposed that polymers are long-chain molecules that are connected by structural units through common covalent bonds. This conclusion laid the foundation for the establishment of modern polymer science. Subsequently, Carothers divided the synthetic polymers into two broad categories, namely a polycondensate obtained by a polycondensation reaction and an addition polymer obtained by a polyaddition reaction. In the 1950s, K. Ziegler and G. Natta discovered a coordination polymerization catalyst and pioneered the era of synthesis of stereoregular polymers. In the decades after the establishment of the concept of macromolecules, the synthesis of high polymers has achieved rapid development, and many important polymers have been industrialized one after another.

== Classification ==
The basics of division of polymers into thermoplastics, elastomers and thermosets helps define their areas of application.

=== Thermoplastics ===
Thermoplastic refers to a plastic that has heat softening and cooling hardening properties. Most of the plastics we use in our daily lives fall into this category. It becomes soft and even flows when heated, and the cooling becomes hard. This process is reversible and can be repeated. Thermoplastics have relatively low tensile moduli, but also have lower densities and properties such as transparency which make them ideal for consumer products and medical products. They include polyethylene, polypropylene, nylon, acetal resin, polycarbonate and PET, all of which are widely used materials.

=== Elastomers ===
An elastomer generally refers to a material that can be restored to its original state after removal of an external force, whereas a material having elasticity is not necessarily an elastomer. The elastomer is only deformed under weak stress, and the stress can be quickly restored to a polymer material close to the original state and size. Elastomers are polymers which have very low moduli and show reversible extension when strained, a valuable property for vibration absorption and damping. They may either be thermoplastic (in which case they are known as Thermoplastic elastomers) or crosslinked, as in most conventional rubber products such as tyres. Typical rubbers used conventionally include natural rubber, nitrile rubber, polychloroprene, polybutadiene, styrene-butadiene and fluorinated rubbers.

=== Thermosets ===
A thermosetting resin is used as a main component, and a plastic which forms a product is formed by a cross-linking curing process in combination with various necessary additives. It is liquid in the early stage of the manufacturing or molding process, and it is insoluble and infusible after curing, and it cannot be melted or softened again. Common thermosetting plastics are phenolic plastics, epoxy plastics, aminoplasts, unsaturated polyesters, alkyd plastics, and the like. Thermoset plastics and thermoplastics together constitute the two major components of synthetic plastics. Thermosetting plastics are divided into two types: formaldehyde cross-linking type and other cross-linking type.

Thermosets includes phenolic resins, polyesters and epoxy resins, all of which are used widely in composite materials when reinforced with stiff fibers such as fiberglass and aramids. Since crosslinking stabilises the thermoset polymer matrix of these materials, they have physical properties more similar to traditional engineering materials like steel. However, their very much lower densities compared with metals makes them ideal for lightweight structures. In addition, they suffer less from fatigue, so are ideal for safety-critical parts which are stressed regularly in service.

== Materials ==
=== Plastic ===
Plastic is a polymer compound which is polymerized by polyaddition polymerization and polycondensation. It is free to change the composition and shape. It is made up of synthetic resins and fillers, plasticizers, stabilizers, lubricants, colorants and other additives. The main component of plastic is resin. Resin means that the polymer compound has not been added with various additives. The term resin was originally named for the secretion of oil from plants and animals, such as rosin and shellac. Resin accounts for approximately 40% - 100% of the total weight of the plastic. The basic properties of plastics are mainly determined by the nature of the resin, but additives also play an important role. Some plastics are basically made of synthetic resins, with or without additives such as plexiglass, polystyrene, etc.

=== Fiber ===
Fiber refers to a continuous or discontinuous filament of one substance. Animals and plant fibers play an important role in maintaining tissue. Fibers are widely used and can be woven into good threads, thread ends and hemp ropes. They can also be woven into fibrous layers when making paper or feel. They are also commonly used to make other materials together with other materials to form composites. Therefore, whether it is natural or synthetic fiber filamentous material. In modern life, the application of fiber is ubiquitous, and there are many high-tech products.

=== Rubber ===
Rubber refers to highly elastic polymer materials and reversible shapes. It is elastic at room temperature and can be deformed with a small external force. After removing the external force, it can return to the original state. Rubber is a completely amorphous polymer with a low glass transition temperature and a large molecular weight, often greater than several hundred thousand. Highly elastic polymer compounds can be classified into natural rubber and synthetic rubber. Natural rubber processing extracts gum rubber and grass rubber from plants; synthetic rubber is polymerized by various monomers. Rubber can be used as elastic, insulating, water-impermeable air-resistant materials.

== Applications ==
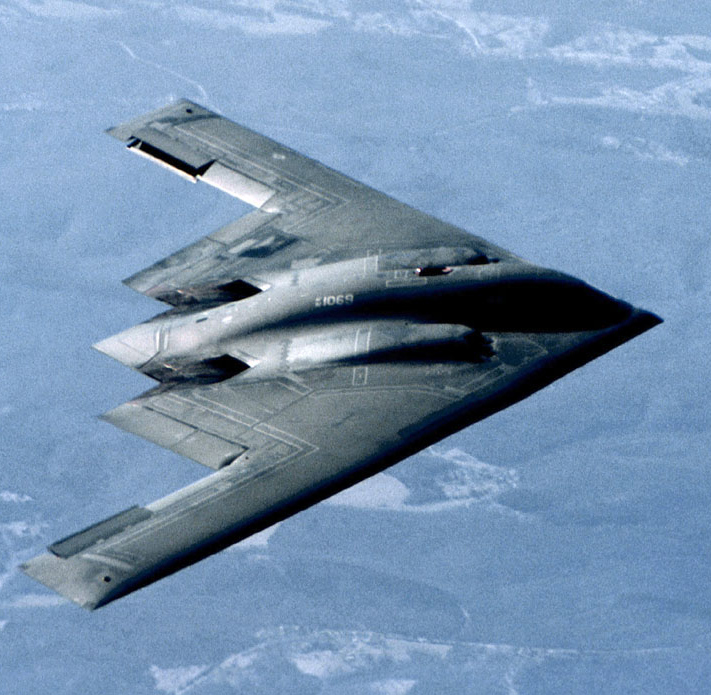
B-2 Spirit stealth bomber of the U.S. Air Force.

=== Polyethylene ===
Commonly used polyethylenes can be classified into low density polyethylene (LDPE), high density polyethylene (HDPE), and linear low density polyethylene (LLDPE). Among them, HDPE has better thermal, electrical and mechanical properties, while LDPE and LLDPE have better flexibility, impact properties and film forming properties. LDPE and LLDPE are mainly used for plastic bags, plastic wraps, bottles, pipes and containers; HDPE is widely used in various fields such as film, pipelines and daily necessities because its resistance to many different solvents.

=== Polypropylene ===
Polypropylene is widely used in various applications due to its good chemical resistance and weldability. It has lowest density among commodity plastics. It is commonly used in packaging applications, consumer goods, automatic applications and medical applications. Polypropylene sheets are widely used in industrial sector to produce acid and chemical tanks, sheets, pipes, Returnable Transport Packaging (RTP), etc. because of its properties like high tensile strength, resistance to high temperatures and corrosion resistance.

=== Composites ===
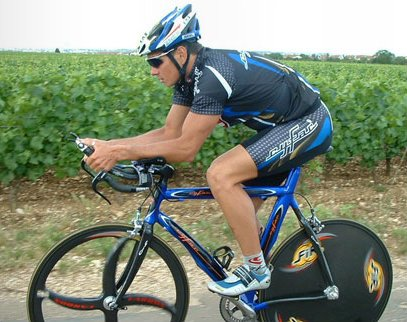
A time-trial carbon fibre composite bicycle with aerodynamic wheels and aero bars

Typical uses of composites are monocoque structures for aerospace and automobiles, as well as more mundane products like fishing rods and bicycles. The stealth bomber was the first all-composite aircraft, but many passenger aircraft like the Airbus and the Boeing 787 use an increasing proportion of composites in their fuselages, such as hydrophobic melamine foam. The quite different physical properties of composites gives designers much greater freedom in shaping parts, which is why composite products often look different from conventional products. On the other hand, some products such as drive shafts, helicopter rotor blades, and propellers look identical to metal precursors owing to the basic functional needs of such components.

=== Biomedical applications ===
Biodegradable polymers are widely used materials for many biomedical and pharmaceutical applications. These polymers are considered very promising for controlled drug delivery devices. Biodegradable polymers also offer great potential for wound management, orthopaedic devices, dental applications and tissue engineering. Not like non biodegradable polymers, they won't require a second step of a removal from body. Biodegradable polymers will break down and are absorbed by the body after they served their purpose. Since 1960, polymers prepared from glycolic acid and lactic acid have found a multitude of uses in the medical industry. Polylactates (PLAs) are popular for drug delivery system due to their fast and adjustable degradation rate.

=== Membrane technologies ===
Membrane techniques are successfully used in the separation in the liquid and gas systems for years, and the polymeric membranes are used most commonly because they have lower cost to produce and are easy to modify their surface, which make them suitable in different separation processes. Polymers helps in many fields including the application for separation of biological active compounds, proton exchange membranes for fuel cells and membrane contractors for carbon dioxide capture process.

== Related Major ==
- Petroleum / Chemical / Mineral / Geology
- Raw materials and processing
- New energy
- Automobiles and spare parts
- Other industries
- Electronic Technology / Semiconductor / Integrated Circuit
- Machinery / Equipment / Heavy Industry
- Medical equipment / instruments

== See also ==
- Materials science
- Polymer science
- Polymers
- Medical grade silicone
- Category:Polymer scientists and engineers

== Bibliography ==
- Lewis, Peter Rhys, and Gagg, C, Forensic Polymer Engineering: Why polymer products fail in service, Woodhead/CRC Press (2010).
- Asua, José María. Polymer Reaction Engineering, Blackwell Publishing (2007).
