= Grupa Azoty =

Polish chemical company

Grupa Azoty S.A.
- Formerly: Zakłady Azotowe in Tarnów-Mościce
- Type: Spółka Akcyjna
- Traded as: WSE: ATT; WIG30 component
- ISIN: PLZATRM00012
- Industry: Chemicals
- Founded: 1927
- Founder: Ignacy Mościcki and State Treasury
- Headquarters: 33-101 Tarnów ul. Eugeniusza Kwiatkowskiego 8, Lesser Poland Voivodeship, Poland
- Key people: Mariusz Bober (CEO and Chairman of the executive board), Witold Szczypiński (VP); Tomasz Hinc (VP); Paweł Łapiński (VP); Józef Rojek (VP); Artur Kopeć (VP)
- Products: Fertilizer, Plastic, chemicals, Oxo alcohol, Pigments
- Revenue: ▲24.657 billion PLN (2022)
- Operating income: ▼865.6 mln PLN (2022)
- Net income: ▼583.8 million PLN(2022)
- Total assets: ▲8.916 billion PLN (2022)
- Total equity: ▲9.956 billion PLN (2022)
- Owners: State Treasury (33%), Norica Holding, ING OFE, TFI PZU, European Bank for Reconstruction and Development
- Number of employees: 15,609 (2019)
- Website: http://grupaazoty.com//

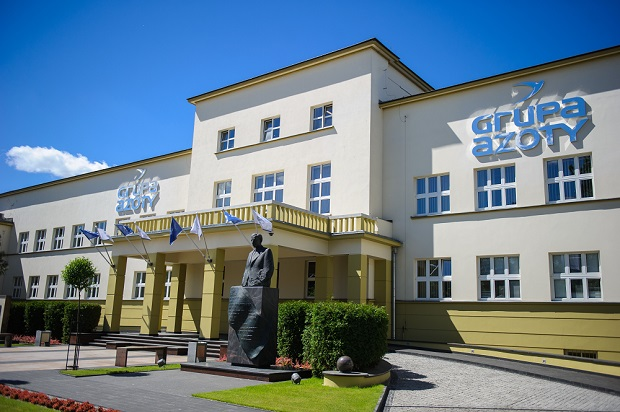
Main headquarters of Grupa Azoty in Tarnów

Grupa Azoty S.A. (until 2013 Zakłady Azotowe in Tarnów-Mościce) is a major Polish chemical industry company headquartered in the Mościce district of Tarnów, in the Lesser Poland Voivodeship of southeastern Poland.

The company was established in 1927, during the Second Polish Republic, as one of the most modern factories in Europe at the time. Currently, Grupa Azoty is the largest chemical company in Poland and is a major producer of fertilizers, plastics, chemicals, oxo alcohols and pigments.

At the end of 2019, the group employed 15,609 employees in 50 companies located both in Poland and abroad. In 2022, Grupa Azoty posted a revenue of over 24 billion PLN ($ 5.5 billion). As of 2023, the company is the second largest producer of fertilizers in the European Union. The company markets its products to over 100 countries worldwide. Grupa Azoty is listed on the Warsaw Stock Exchange (WSE) and is a component of the WIG30 stock market index.

== History ==
Since 2010, Azoty Tarnów have been undergoing a consolidation as one of the largest chemical enterprises in the country. The first significant event was its acquisition of 100% shares of the Unylon Polymers GmbH in Guben/Germany – polyamide manufacturing enterprise. The German business entered the Azoty Tarnów Capital Group and changed its name to ATT Polymers.

Another step involved consolidating the Polish chemical industry, by merging the largest companies in this sector on the domestic market. This began by amalgamating Zakłady Azotowe in Tarnów with Zakłady Azotowe in Kędzierzyn-Koźle (ZAK S.A.). Azoty Tarnów purchased 52.6% B series shares of ZAK S.A. for PLN 150 million.

In 2011, a decision was made to amalgamate Azoty Tarnów with Zakłady Chemiczne in Police (near Szczecin), with the State Treasury holding 60% of the shares. The Management Boards of both companies were in favour of the consolidation. Having obtained the consent of the Office of Competition and Consumer Protection and due to lack of objections from the German Federal Cartel Office, the facility in Tarnów began raising the funds necessary to complete the purchase. ZCh Police was successful in raising the funds for a controlling stake by issuing 25 million C series shares, approved by the Polish Financial Supervision Authority. Not only did these funds allow them to take over control over Police, but also to buy back another 40% of shares of the facility in Kędzierzyn from the state Treasury.

=== Hostile take over bid ===
In 2012, Azoty Tarnów became the target of a hostile take-over bid by the Russian Acron Group. On 16 May, the Russian company attempted to take control of the Polish chemical company through its subsidiary Norica Holding S.à r.l. They announced a tender of PLN 36 per share for Zakłady Azotowe in Tarnów-Mościce. Acron Group managed to purchase only 12% of available shares. Steps taken by the company's management board and by the Polish Treasury, such as adoption by Parliament of legislation to control certain state investments, secured the enterprise against future hostile take-overs.

In 2023, Akron owned 19.82% of Grupa Azoty. These shares were frozen as Akron owner Viatcheslav Kantor came under European sanctions imposed in the wake of the 2022 Russian invasion of Ukraine. In July 2023, the Polish authorities transferred Acron's stake in Grupa Azoty to external management and began looking for a buyer.

=== Expansion ===
On 13 July 2012, an offer for 6,116,800 shares of the Zakłady Azotowe in Puławy at PLN 110 per share, was announced. As a result of the call, the facility in Tarnów managed to obtain 10.3% shares of the facility in Puławy. This offer was the first step in the consolidation of the two largest chemical companies in Poland. The idea of merging Zakłady Azotowe in Puławy with Azoty Tarnów was supported by the Polish Treasury and the trade unions. On 15 November 2012 the management boards of Zakłady Azotowe in Tarnów and Puławy concluded an agreement for establishing the principles of cooperation and conducting negotiations. Later, Azoty Tarnów issued shares, available solely to the shareholders of the company in Puławy. They exchanged shares held in Zakłady in Puławy for shares of the Tarnów company, at a ratio of 1:2. Full performance of this stage still required consent of the European Commission for the merger of both companies which was issued on 13 January 2013. Finally, a buy-back allowed Azoty Tarnów to purchase 95% of shares in Zakłady Azotowe in Puławy. Consolidation of the enterprises in Tarnów, Puławy, Police and Kędzierzyn-Koźle allowed for formation of one of the largest fertiliser companies in Europe, operating under the name of Grupa Azoty, consolidating ca. 75-80 per cent of the national fertiliser production.

On 21 November 2013, the Company purchased 85% of shares of the only Polish sulphur producer by smelting, Kopalnia i Zakłady Chemiczne Siarki, "Siarkopol" S.A. in Grzybów, from the Treasury. The value of the transaction was ca. PLN 400 million.

Another important event in the history of the company was the purchase of a Phosphorite mine in Senegal by Grupa Azoty Zakłady Chemiczne „Police" S.A. Zakłady in Police was able to purchase a controlling stake of 55% of AIG company shares for $28.5 million. This investment, now a subsidiary of Grupa Azoty, secured its own source of raw material for the production of phosphorus and other multi-ingredient fertilisers integral to its business.

In 2018, Grupa Azoty acquired German company Goat TopCo GmbH based in Münster for a reported EUR 226.6 million. The company operates within the specialty fertilizers segment and owns COMPO EXPERT company. The transaction was aimed at strengthening the company's position as a leading provider of agricultural solutions.

== A leading European player ==
It is currently the largest chemical holding company in Poland. It is also a leading chemicals company in Europe, where it is the second largest producer of mineral fertilizers and melamine, the third largest producer of compound fertilizers, and the fifth largest producer of plasticisers and polyamide 6.

== Organisational structure ==
Grupa Azoty (formerly: Zakłady Azotowe in Tarnów-Mościce S.A.) forms a Holding Group with the following subsidiaries:

- Grupa Azoty Zakłady Azotowe "Puławy" S.A.(abridged name: Grupa Azoty PUŁAWY).
- Grupa Azoty Zakłady Chemiczne "Police" S.A. (abridged name: Grupa Azoty POLICE).
- Grupa Azoty Zakłady Azotowe Kędzierzyn S. A. (abridged name: Grupa Azoty ZAK).
- Grupa Azoty ATT Polymers GmbH – producer of PA-6 in Western Europe, the company, as a result of affiliation with the Grupa Azoty, it is integrated with the supplier of caprolactam – material used in PA-6 production.
- Grupa Azoty Kopalnie i Zakłady Chemiczne Siarki "Siarkopol" S.A. (abridged name: Grupa Azoty SIARKOPOL, former KiZCHS Siarkopol S.A. in Grzybów).
- Grupa Azoty Polskie Konsorcjum Chemiczne Sp. z o.o. (abridged name: Grupa Azoty PKCh).
- Grupa Azoty Jednostka Ratownictwa Chemicznego Sp. z o.o. (abridged name: Grupa Azoty JRCh) – provides services within the scope of chemical rescue.
- Grupa Azoty Automatyka Sp. z o.o. (abridged name: Grupa Azoty AUTOMATYKA) – main field of operation: industrial automatics.
- Grupa Azoty PROReM Sp. z o.o. – technological installations for chemical power engineering, nutritional industry and others.
- EKO Technologies Consortium
- EKOTAR Sp. z o.o. Consortium
- Grupa Azoty Koltar Sp. z o.o. (abbridged name: Grupa Azoty KOLTAR ) - performing certified transport of goods, railway rolling stock rental, overhaul and maintenance of railway tracks.
- Grupa Azoty "Folie" Sp. z o.o.
- Grupa Azoty Azoty "Compounding" Sp. z o.o.
- Navitrans Sp. z o.o.

== Products ==
Grupa Azoty is currently the second largest producer of mineral fertilizers and third of compound fertilisers in the European Union. It is also present in the sector of construction plastics, OXO alcohols and plasticizers. It offers a rich range of products made in particular plants in Tarnów, Puławy, Kędzierzyn-Koźle and Police, Gdańsk, Grzybów, Chorzów and in Guben (Germany).

=== Main fields of operation ===
- Agricultural fertilisers

Mineral fertilisers are one of the main products of Grupa Azoty. It specialises in the production of nitric and compound fertilizers. Additionally, in the sector the company produces ammonia and other nitrogen-based half-products. Grupa Azoty mines phosphorite, the main material in compound fertilizer production from its part-owned mine in Senegal. Grupa Azoty leads the Polish market and is the second largest producer of mineral fertilizers in the European Union.

- Plastics

Engineering plastics (polyamide 6 (PA6) and modified plastics) are produced as well as auxiliary products such as caprolactam and other chemicals. Currently, the largest factory of Polyamide 6 in Tarnów is under construction, which will allow Grupa Azoty to increase its production possibilities and become the leading producer of this material in Europe.

- Chemicals

Another activity of the Group is chemical production, focusing on: OXO products, urea, melamine and sulphur. Grupa Azoty is the third largest producer of melamine in the world and second in the European Union. Whereas, in OXO products, Grupa Azoty is the only one in Poland and seventh in Europe in terms of OXO alcohol production as well as the largest national and fifth largest European company producing plasticisers.

- Power engineering

Electric power and heat produced in the plant are sold locally, in the vicinity of the company. The Group has its own distribution networks for power utilities and energy. Currently, construction plans of new heat-power blocks are made in the premises of plants in Kędzierzyn and Puławy.

== Research and development ==
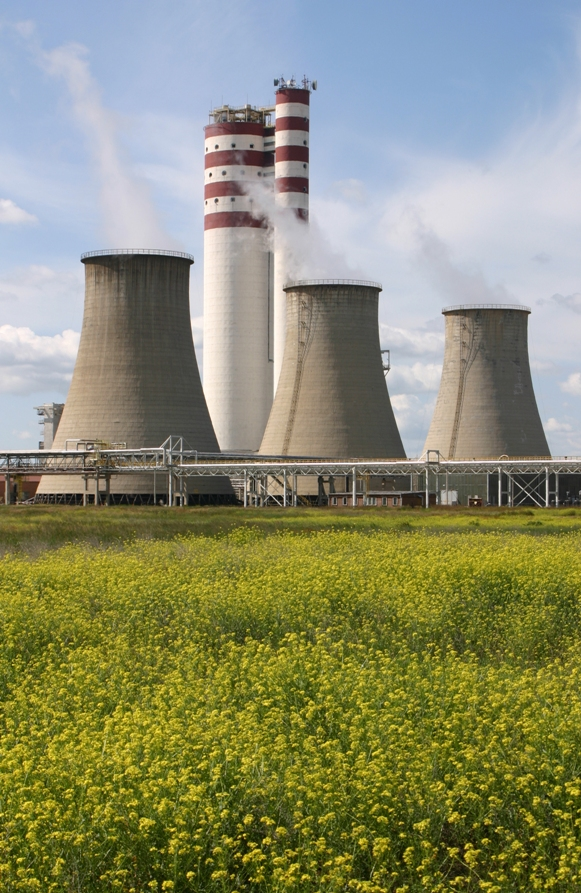
Zakłady Azotowe Puławy, part of Grupa Azoty

- Coal gasification

Grupa Azoty has an agreement with AGH University of Science and Technology in the field of developing pure coal technologies and their implementation on an industrial scale in Poland. The joint projects concern research into coal preparation for gasification, its application in chemical processes, development of technologies for using slag and dust produced during coal gasification processing, energy and emissive conditions that are in line with requirements of the European Union. In addition to AGH, Grupa Azoty cooperates with Tauron and KGHM in the project, with which letters of intent were signed.

- Stearin production

In 2013, Zakłady Azotowe Chorzów (part of Grupa Azoty PULAWY), the first installation for stearin production in Poland yields 13.2 tons per year.

- Investment in Senegal

In 2013, Grupa Azoty POLICE purchased 55% of shares in the African Investment Group, which gave the Polish concern access to the raw material deposits in Senegal: ilmenite sand deposits Sud Saint Louis and calcium phosphate deposits in the Lam Lam and Kebemer region. In addition to the purchase of the mines, Grupa Azoty plans to start production of phosphoric acid in Senegal.

- Cooperation with Lotos

Grupa Azoty in cooperation with Lotos prepared a feasibility study for a new petrochemical complex in Gdańsk (project performance was delayed in time due to other priorities of both companies).

- Cooperation with Synthos

Grupa Azoty began a collaboration with Synthos, through its Zakłady Azotowe in Chorzów. Grupa Azoty then collaborated with the Pfleiderer Grajewo company, a producer of materials based on wood.

- Cooperation with KGHM

KGHM started research in the region of Puck Bay, with the aim of prospecting for potassium-magnesium salt and rock-salt deposits. KGHM plans to exploit potassium-magnesium deposits jointly with Grupa Azoty. It is estimated that the by means of deposit exploitation in the Puck region, it is possible to obtain 600 million tons of material with potassium oxide content from 7 to 13.7 percent.

- Cooperation with PZU S.A.

PZU S.A. and Grupa Azoty will provide support to small companies for scientific research and commercialization.

- Cooperation with PKP Cargo S.A.

The contract for transport of chemicals, containers and other goods to companies in Grupa Azoty was concluded on 16 October 2014.

- Collaboration with scientific centres

Grupa Azoty (and its subsidiaries organises student internships, meetings with graduates and conducts research with scientific institutes from all over the country.

- Membership of Chatham House, Royal Institute of International Affairs

In September 2015, Grupa Azoty was admitted to the London-based Chatham House. It is one of over 300 member companies, representing various sectors: financial, industrial, health, energetic, telecommunication and commercial as well as the most important embassies, international organisations and universities. Grupa Azoty is the first Institute's partner from Central Europe.

- The commencement of a Poland-wide programme of soil testing

With its mission statement, "Earth is Knowledge" - in cooperation with PKO Bank Polski, Grupa Azoty commenced nationwide 3-year programme of testing soil Ph and soil nutritional elements. In the scope of the programme, the companies aim to reach nearly 2 thousand agricultural households in the entire country and test 28 thousand samples in cooperation with Regional Chemical-Agricultural Stations.

- Establishing a Centre for Civil Defence Education

On 12 March 2015, the activity of the Centre for Civil Defence Education of Grupa Azoty (CERGA) was commenced. It is a modern unit responsible for periodic and specialist training of firefighters and chemical paramedics working in Grupa Azoty. Its activity includes all companies affiliated in Grupa Azoty and other entities interested in taking advantage of the training offer. The aim of establishing CERGA was to support the development of common norms in fire safety and emergency services with the exchange of experience between paramedic units.

=== Listing ===
- Respect Index

Grupa Azoty have been listed in the RESPECT Index on the Warsaw Stock Exchange since 19 November 2009. This project aims to highlight companies that are managed responsibly and sustainably by their reporting quality, level of investor engagement and information dissemination. The choice of companies for the index is conducted according to a three-stage process. GPW analyses the financial matters, strategy and principles of organisation management, environmental factors, employment policy and relations with employees as well as the influence on the market.

== Investments ==
- In 2014–2020, the concern plans further investments in the following sectors: ammonia production, mechanical granulation, solution of urea ammonium nitrate, phosphoric acid production, polyamide and plasticisers. This will involve 68 investment projects for the amount of PLN 7 billion.
- Investments in plants in Tarnów: new factory of polyamide 6 plastic with productive capacity of 80 thousand tons per year (as a result, S.A. will be the second producer of this material in Europe); new installation for artificial fertilizer granulation worth PLN 140 million; modernisation of c-non of phenol installation, development of polyamide processing installation and introducing an iron-chromium catalyser of new generation onto the market.
- Investments in plants of Grupa Azoty POLICE: construction of new installation for propylene production with PDH method; the estimated cost is PLN 1.68 billion. It will be the most modern and largest installation of this type in Europe.; building phosphorite mines in Senegal; expanding the port in Police with a terminal for fluid chemicals, the target of which will be service of LNG supplies.
- Investments in plants of Grupa Azoty PUŁAWY: construction of energetic block with capacity of 440 MW, new installation for fertilizer granulation as well as modernisation of old and building a new line of nitric acid.
- Investments in plants of Grupa Azoty KĘDZIERZYN. construction of new power-heat plant, producing 25 MW of electric power and 140 Mg/h of megawatts of thermal energy: installation for urea-ammonium nitrate UAN fertilisers.

== Corporate social responsibility ==
Grupa Azoty is highly involved in the life of local community in Tarnów, supporting, e.g. the cultural enterprises: musical festival Grupa Azoty Jazz Contest Tarnów, Grupa Azoty Grand Festival or New Year Charity Concert of Grupa Azoty in Lusławice, film festival "Tarnów Film Award", Comedy Festival "Talia" as well as ArtFest Art Festival. Grupa Azoty is involved in organising Investment Forum in Tarnów which is a part of Economic Forum in Krynica. In addition, it cooperates with Tarnów authorities in the scope of town development, co-finances road and ring road construction and incinerating plant.

== Ecology ==
Aside from meeting the criteria for inclusion on the Respect Index on Warsaw's stock exchange, the company's role in analysing and counteracting any hazardous or negative effects of their activities on the natural environment in Europe and Africa are not recorded.

=== Sport sponsorship ===
Grupa Azoty supports several sports disciplines:

- Men's handball club Azoty Puławy
- Men's handball club Unia Tarnów
- Men's volleyball club ZAKSA Kędzierzyn-Koźle
- Women's volleyball club Chemik Police

So far, the business has supported such sports people as:

- Robert Kubica (WRC)
- Piotr Zyła (ski-jumping)
- Justyna Wałaś (boxing)
- Klaudia Buczek
- Marcin Dzieński,
- Edyta Ropek,
- Michał Derus,
- Renata Knapik (climbing). Grupa Azoty is also the main partner of Polish Skiing Association.

Grupa Azoty initiated a programme Grupa Azoty Start, to support sport development for children and youth (established cooperation with kindergarten school UKS Jaskółki, Interschool Sports Club Pałac Młodzieży Tarnów, MUKS 1811 Tarnów) and the development of Polish cross-country skiing.
