= List of synthetic polymers =

List of human-made polymers

Some familiar household synthetic polymers include: Nylons in textiles and fabrics, Teflon in non-stick pans, Bakelite for electrical switches, polyvinyl chloride (PVC) in pipes, etc. The common PET bottles are made of a synthetic polymer, polyethylene terephthalate. The plastic kits and covers are mostly made of synthetic polymers like polythene, and tires are manufactured from polybutadienes. However, due to the environmental issues created by these synthetic polymers which are mostly non-biodegradable and often synthesized from petroleum, alternatives like bioplastics are also being considered. They are however expensive when compared to the synthetic polymers.

IUPAC definition

Artificial polymer: Man-made polymer that is not a biopolymer.

Note 1: Artificial polymer should also be used in the case of chemically
modified biopolymers.

Note 2: Biochemists are now capable of synthesizing copies of biopolymers
that should be named Synthetic biopolymer to make a distinction
with true biopolymers.

Note 3: Genetic engineering is now capable of generating non-natural analogues
of biopolymers that should be referred to as artificial biopolymers, e.g.,
artificial protein, artificial polynucleotide, etc.

== Inorganic polymers ==
- Polysiloxane
- Polyphosphazene
- Polyborazyline

== Organic polymers ==
The eight most common types of synthetic organic polymers, which are commonly found in households are:

- Low-density polyethylene (LDPE)
- High-density polyethylene (HDPE)
- Polypropylene (PP)
- Polyethylene (PE)
- Polyvinyl chloride (PVC)
- Polystyrene (PS)
- Nylon, nylon 6, nylon 6,6
- Teflon (Polytetrafluoroethylene)
- Thermoplastic polyurethanes (TPU)

List of some addition polymers and their uses
Polymer	Abbreviation	Properties	Uses
Low-density polyethylene	LDPE	Chemically inert, flexible, insulator	Squeeze bottles, toys, flexible pipes, insulation cover (electric wires), six-pack rings, etc.
High-density polyethylene	HDPE	Inert, thermally stable, tough and high tensile strength	Bottles, pipes, inner insulation (dielectric) of coax cable (see also PTFE), plastic bags, etc.
Polypropylene	PP	Resistant to acids and alkalies, High tensile strength	Auto parts, industrial fibers, food containers, liner in bags, dishware and as a wrapping material for textiles and food
Polystyrene (thermocole)	PS	Thermal insulator. Properties depends on the form, expanded form is tough and rigid	Petri dishes, CD case, plastic cutlery
Polytetrafluoroethylene	PTFE	Very low coefficient of friction, excellent dielectric properties, chemically inert	Low friction bearings, non-stick pans, inner insulation (dielectric) of coax cable (see also HDPE), coating against chemical attack etc.
Polyvinyl chloride	PVC	Insulator, flame retardant, chemically inert	Pipe (mainly draining), fencing, lawn chairs, hand-bags, curtain clothes, non-food bottles, raincoats, toys, vinyl flooring, electrical installation insulations, etc.
Polychlorotrifluoroethylene	PCTFE	Stable to heat and thermal attacks, high tensile strength and non wetting	valves, seals, gaskets etc.

== Brand names ==
These polymers are often better known through their brand names, for instance:

Brand Name	Polymer	Characteristic properties	Uses
Bakelite	Phenol-formaldehyde resin	High electric, heat and chemical resistance	Insulation of wires, manufacturing sockets, electrical devices, brake pads, etc.
Kevlar	Para-aramid fibre	High tensile strength	Manufacturing armour, sports and musical equipment. Used in the field of cryogenics
Twaron	Para-aramid	Heat resistant and strong fibre	Bullet-proof body armor, helmets, brake pads, ropes, cables and optical fibre cables, etc. and as an asbestos substitute
Mylar	Polyethylene terephthalate film	High strength and stiffness, less permeable to gases, almost reflects light completely	Food packaging, transparent covering over paper, reflector for rollsigns and solar cooking stoves
Neoprene	Polychloroprene	Chemically inert	Manufacturing gaskets, corrosion resistant coatings, waterproof seat covers, substitute for corks and latex
Nylon	Polyamide	Silky, thermoplastic and resistant to biological and chemical agents	Stockings, fabrics, toothbrushes. Molded nylon is used in making machine screws, gears etc.
Nomex	Meta-aramid polymer	Excellent thermal, chemical, and radiation resistance, rigid, durable and fireproof.	Hood of firefighter's mask, electrical lamination of circuit boards and transformer cores and in Thermal Micrometeoroid Garment
Orlon	Polyacrylonitrile (PAN)	Wool-like, resistant to chemicals, oils, moths and sunlight	Used for making clothes and fabrics like sweaters, hats, yarns, rugs, etc., and as a precursor of carbon fibres
Rilsan	Polyamide 11 & 12	Bioplastic	Used in high-performance applications such as sports shoes, electronic device components, automotive fuel lines, pneumatic airbrake tubing, oil and gas flexible pipes and control fluid umbilicals, and catheters.
Technora	Copolyamid	High tensile strength, resistance to corrosion, heat, chemicals and saltwater	Used for manufacturing optical fiber cables, umbilical cables, drumheads, automotive industry, ropes, wire ropes and cables
Teflon	Polytetrafluoroethylene (PTFE)	Very low coefficient of friction, excellent dielectric properties, high melting, chemically inert	Plain bearings, gears, non-stick pans, etc. due to its low friction. Used as a tubing for highly corrosive chemicals.
Ultem	Polyimide	Heat, flame and solvent resistant. Has high dielectric strength	Used in medical and chemical instrumentation, also in guitar picks
Vectran	aromatic polyester	High thermal and chemical stability. Golden color. Has high strength, low creep, and is moisture resistant	Used as reinforcing fibres for ropes, cables, sailcloth. Also used in manufacturing badminton strings, bike tires and in electronics applications. Is the key component of a line of inflatable spacecraft developed by Bigelow Aerospace
Viton	Poly(vinylidene fluoride-co-hexafluoropropylene)	Elastomer	Depends on the grade of the polymer. Viton B is used in chemical process plants and gaskets.
Zylon	poly-p-phenylene-2,6-benzobisoxazole (PBO)	Very high tensile strength and thermal stability	Used in tennis racquets, table tennis blades, body armor, etc.

== See also ==
- Polymerization
- RAFT (chemistry)
