= Grupa Azoty ATT Polymers GmbH =

German chemical company

Grupa Azoty ATT Polymers GmbH (abridged name: Grupa Azoty ATT POLYMERS)—one of the enterprises producing polyamide 6 (PA6) in Western Europe. Acquired by Zakłady Azotowe w Tarnowie-Mościcach in 2009, currently a member of Grupa Azoty, in the production of fertilizers, construction materials, and caprolactam. Grupa Azoty ATT POLYMERS is situated in Guben, (Germany).

The company has its own laboratory and cooperates with a modern laboratory of the Grupa Azoty located in Tarnów. Its activity is focused on both the development of existing products as well as on research on new products.

== History ==
In 1958, the authorities of the German Democratic Republic decided to increase the volume of national production of synthetic fibres. The main element of that plan was the construction of the chemical complex in Guben. The first facilities of Chemiefaserwerk Guben were constructed in 1960 in the place of former arms factories Rheinmetall-Borsig, whereas in 1964, the trial production was commenced. In 1968, polyamide 6 was produced for the first time, which was used to produce carpet yarn. In the years 1979–1980, the production possibilities were expanded within the field of PA6.

Upon German reunification, the plants operated under the name of Chemiefaserwerk Guben GmbH. As a result of multiple ownership changes in 1998, the company Plastomid Polymere GmbH was founded, which was a specialist in polyamide 6 production (20 thousand tons per year). Two years later, the Polymerisation reactors were modernised by their adjustment to two-stage production. Since then, in addition to new types of high-viscose granulate, it has been possible to enter the foil market. In 2005, the company changed its name to Unylon Polymers GmbH and increased the production capacity to 47 thousand tons of PA6 per year. As a result of the financial crisis, it was not possible to maintain the production profitability, and bankruptcy proceedings were commenced in 2009. One of its elements was looking for an investor who would take over Unylon Polymers GmbH. In 2010, the plants were taken over in 100% by Zakłady Azotowe in Tarnów-Mościce S.A. As a result of a merger of the two largest Polish chemical firms, the company has operated as Grupa Azoty ATT Polymers GmbH since 2013.

== Shareholding structure ==
100% of shares is held by the Grupa Azoty, being the controlling shareholder of the major Polish plants of Great Chemical Synthesis (Kędzierzyn-Koźle, Police, Puławy i Tarnów).

== Management ==
The company is run by two managing directors: Gabriele Kell and Jacek Dychtoń, whereas the members of the Supervisory Board are Andrzej Skolmowski, Małgorzata Malec, and Witold Szczypiński.

== Production ==
Grupa Azoty ATT Polymers GmbH mainly specialises in polyamide 6 production. Its high viscosity allows for its application in, e.g. production of bi-oriented foil, which is used in work with foods. A product named Alphalon™ was distinguished at the PLASTPOL 2011 fair in Kielce.

The production abilities in Grupa Azoty ATT POLYMERS are estimated at 45 thousand tons per year. In 2014, Grupa Azoty gained the possibility to open the next factory of polyamide 6 in Tarnów as a part of the Special Economic Zone in Kraków with the production rate of 80 thousand tons per year. The synergy of these installations allows the company to produce ca. 170 thousand tons of PA6 per year.

== Successes ==
In 2011, at XV International Fairs of Plastics and Rubber Processing PLASTPOL in Kielce, the company was distinguished for alphalon E36LN used to produce bi-oriented foil that can have direct contact with foods.
