= Synthetic biopolymer =

Biopolymers obtained by abiotic chemical routes

IUPAC definitions

Synthetic biopolymers: human-made copies of biopolymers obtained by abiotic chemical routes.

Artificial polymer: human-made polymer that is not a biopolymer

Synthetic biopolymers are human-made copies of biopolymers obtained by abiotic chemical routes. Synthetic biopolymer of different chemical nature have been obtained, including polysaccharides, glycoproteins, peptides and proteins, polyhydroxoalkanoates, polyisoprenes.

== Synthesis of biopolymer ==
The high molecular weight of biopolymers make their synthesis inherently laborious. Further challenges can arise from specific spatial arrangement adopted by the natural biopolymer, which may be vital for its properties/activity but not easily reproducible in the synthetic copy. Despite this, chemical approaches to obtain biopolymer are highly desirable to overcome issues arising from low abundance of the target biopolymer in Nature, the need for cumbersome isolation processes or high batch-to-batch variability or inhomogeneity of the naturally-sourced species.

=== Examples of synthetic biopolymers obtained by chemical routes ===
- cis-1,4-polyisoprene (synthetic analogue of rubber) and trans-1,4-polyisoprene (synthetic analogue of gutta percha) are obtained by coordination polymerisation using suitable Ziegler-Natta catalysts.
- Polyhydroxoalkanoates such as poly(3-hydroxobutyrate), poly(hydroxovaleric acid) etc. obtained by polycondensation and polyaddition. Low-molecular weight polylactide and other polyglycolides can also be obtained by chemical synthesis.
- Oligonucleotides and polynucleotides (DNA or RNA) can be obtain by chemical synthesis through a variety of established approaches.
- A variety of proteins have been obtained by chemical synthesis. A successful approach relies on native chemical ligation, which achieves the synthesis of proteins by linking shorter unprotected peptides. This strategy allowed to obtain, amongst many others, proteins such as insulin-like growth factor 1, the precursor of Aequorea green fluorescent protein and the influenza A virus M2 membrane protein.

=== Examples of biopolymers obtained by chemoenzymatic routes ===
- Polyhydroxoalkanoates and polyesters obtained by enzyme-assisted esterification using lipases.
- Heparin, heparan sulfate and other glycosaminoglycans and plant glycans.
- Polysaccharides such as cellulose, amylose, chitin and derivatives
- Natural and non-natural polynucleotides can be successfully obtained by enzyme-assisted synthesis using ligase- or polymerase-based approaches and template-assisted polymerisation.

Human-made biopolymers obtained through approaches that involve genetic engineering or recombinant DNA technology are different from synthetic biopolymers and should be referred to as artificial biopolymer (e.g., artificial protein, artificial polynucleotide, etc.).

== Applications of synthetic biopolymers ==
As their natural analogues, synthetic biopolymers find applications in numerous fields, including materials for commodities, drug delivery, tissue engineering, therapeutic and diagnostic applications.
