= Addition polymer =

Polymer formed from a chemical reaction with no by-products

In polymer chemistry, an addition polymer is a polymer that forms by simple linking of monomers without the co-generation of other products. Addition polymerization differs from condensation polymerization, which does co-generate a product, usually water. Addition polymers can be formed by chain polymerization, when the polymer is formed by the sequential addition of monomer units to an active site in a chain reaction, or by polyaddition, when the polymer is formed by addition reactions between species of all degrees of polymerization. Addition polymers are formed by the addition of some simple monomer units repeatedly. Generally polymers are unsaturated compounds like alkenes, alkalines etc. The addition polymerization mainly takes place in free radical mechanism. The free radical mechanism of addition polymerization completed by three steps i.e. Initiation of free radical, Chain propagation, Termination of chain.

== Polyolefins ==
Many common addition polymers are formed from unsaturated monomers (usually having a C=C double bond). The most prevalent addition polymers are polyolefins, i.e. polymers derived by the conversion of olefins (alkenes) to long-chain alkanes. The stoichiometry is simple:

n RCH=CH_{2} → [RCH-CH_{2}]_{n}

This conversion can be induced by a variety of catalysts including free radicals, acids, carbanions and metal complexes.

Examples of such polyolefins are polyethenes, polypropylene, PVC, Teflon, Buna rubbers, polyacrylates, polystyrene, and PCTFE.

=== Copolymers ===
When two or more types of monomers undergo addition polymerization, the resulting polymer is an addition copolymer. Saran wrap, formed from polymerization of vinyl chloride and vinylidene chloride, is an addition copolymer.

== Ring-opening polymerization ==
Ring-opening polymerization is an additive process but tends to give condensation-like polymers but follows the stoichiometry of addition polymerization. For example, polyethylene glycol is formed by opening ethylene oxide rings:

HOCH_{2}CH_{2}OH + n C_{2}H_{4}O → HO(CH_{2}CH_{2}O)_{_{n+1}}H

Nylon 6 (developed to thwart the patent on nylon 6,6) is produced by addition polymerization, but chemically resembles typical polyamides.

== Further contrasts with condensation polymers ==
One universal distinction between polymerization types is development of molecular weight by the different modes of propagation. Addition polymers form high molecular weight chains rapidly, with much monomer remaining. Since addition polymerization has rapidly growing chains and free monomer as its reactants, and condensation polymerization occurs in step-wise fashion between monomers, dimers, and other smaller growing chains, the effect of a polymer molecule's current size on a continuing reaction is profoundly different in these two cases. This has important effects on the distribution of molecular weights, or polydispersity, in the finished polymer.

== Biodegradation ==
Addition polymers are generally chemically inert, involving strong C-C bonds. For this reason they are non-biodegradable and difficult to recycle. In contrast, condensation polymers tend to be more readily bio-degradable because their backbones contain weaker bonds.

== History ==
The first useful addition polymer was made by accident in 1933 by ICI chemists Reginald Gibson and Eric Fawcett. They were carrying out a series of experiments that involved reacting organic compounds under high temperatures and high pressures. They set up an experiment to react ethene with benzaldehyde in the hope of producing a ketone. They left the reaction vessel overnight, and the next morning they found a small amount of a white waxy solid. It was shown later that this solid was polyethylene.

IUPAC definition

Chain polymerization: Chain reaction in which the growth of a polymer chain proceeds exclusively by reaction(s) between monomer(s) and active site(s) on the polymer chain with regeneration of the active site(s) at the end of each growth step.

The term "addition polymerization" is deprecated by IUPAC (International Union of Pure and Applied Chemistry) which recommends the alternative term chain polymerization.
