= A Monument to Something That Never Happened =

Coordinates: 50°00′25″N 20°55′24″E

- Pomnik czegoś, co nigdy się nie wydarzyło 28.03.1983
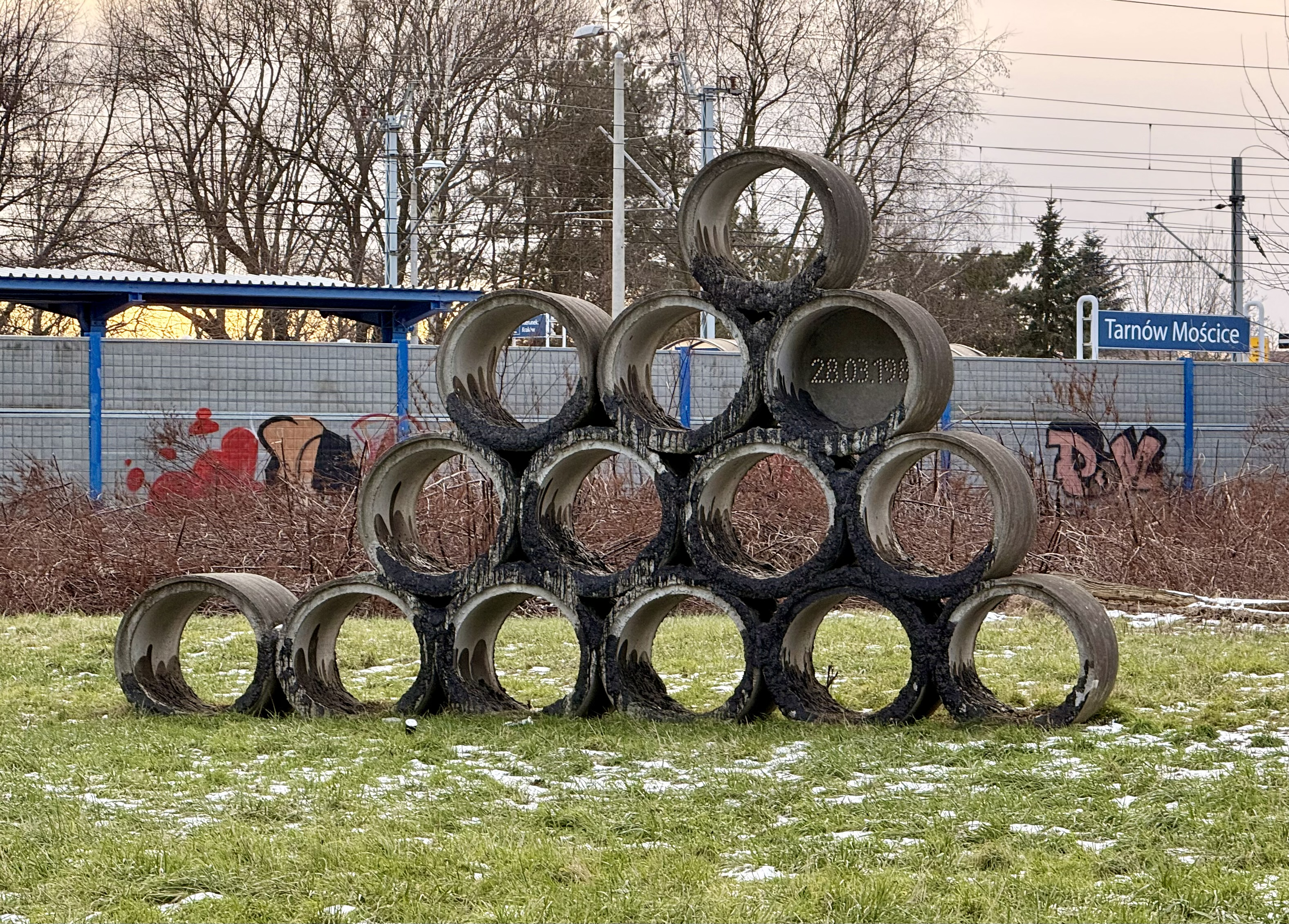
- A general view of the monument from Chemiczna Street, with Tarnów Mościce railway station visible in the background, 2026
- Interactive map of A Monument to Something That Never Happened
- Location: Tarnów, Lesser Poland Voivodeship, Poland
- Designer: Wilhelm Sasnal
- Type: Sculpture
- Material: Concrete rings
- Height: ~4 meters
- Completion date: 2010
- Opening date: 28 August 2010

A Monument to Something That Never Happened (28 March 1983); Polish: Pomnik czegoś, co nigdy się nie wydarzyło (28.03.1983)) is a sculpture designed by Wilhelm Sasnal located in Mościce, Poland.

== Location ==
The sculpture is located in Mościce, a district in the western side of Tarnów. It has been installed in the green space on Chemiczna Street, near the tracks of railway line 91, close to Tarnów Mościce station and Jaskółcze Gniazdo Municipal Stadium.

== Design ==
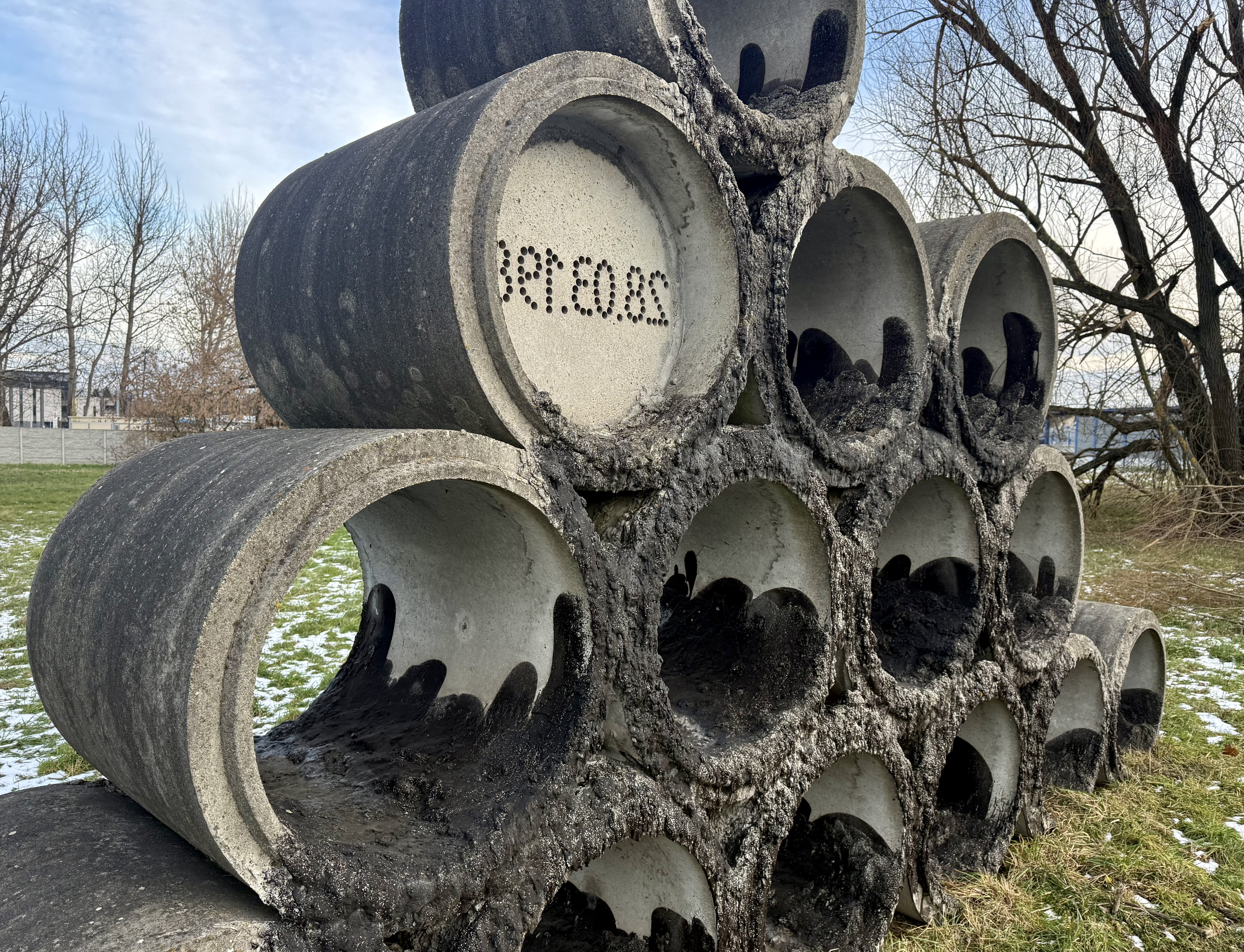
Detail showing the joints between the rings, held together with black adhesive.

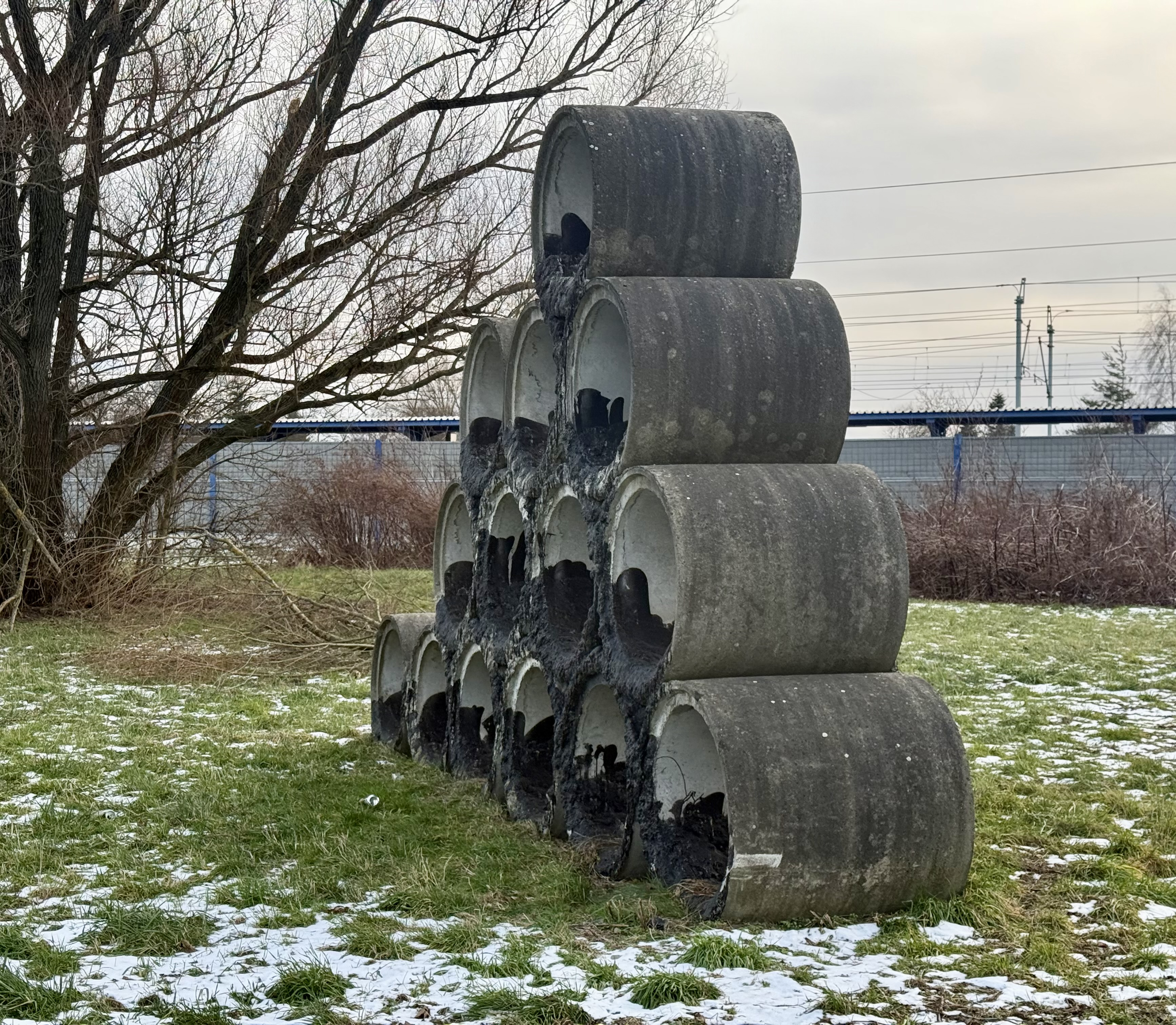
The surroundings of the sculpture, with noise barriers visible in the background along railway line 91

The sculptor, Wilhelm Sasnal, is a Polish artist from Mościce. His 4-metre high (13 ft) creation is made of 14 concrete sewer rings, arranged in the shape of a pyramid and coated with adhesive. A random date is inscribed in one of the circles: 28.03.1983. According to Sasnal, this is the moment when a major disaster could have occurred, but it never materialised. The artwork was unveiled on 28 August 2010 as part of the Tarnów project 1000 lat nowoczesności (English: 1000 Years of Modernity).

== Meaning ==
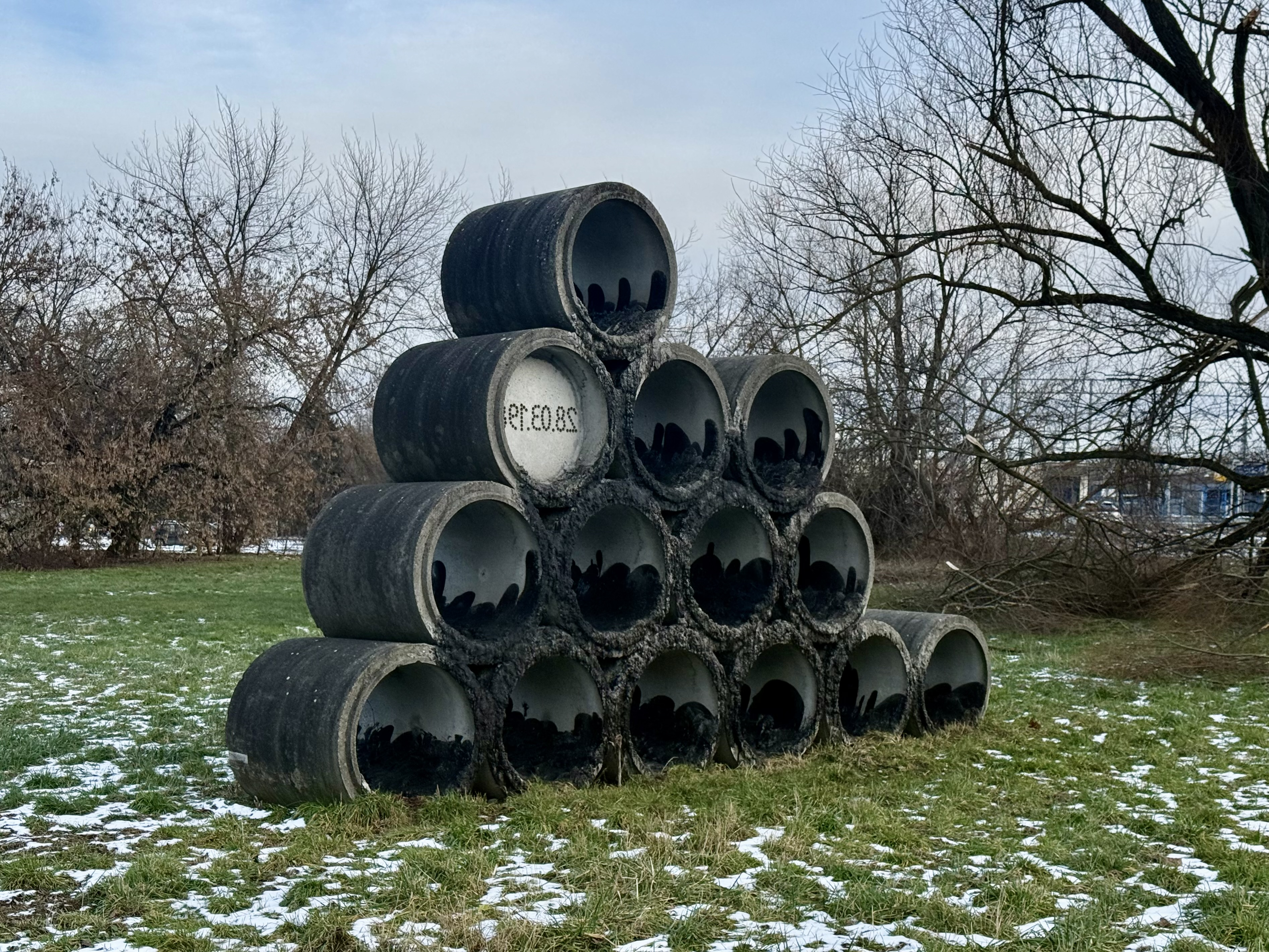
The sculpture from behind

The monument is intended to evoke a sense of threat that was ever-present in Mościce’s social landscape prior to 1989, and thus during the Cold War, prior to the fall of the Iron Curtain and the political transformation in Poland. Sasnal claimed that this fear stemmed from the potential danger posed to the town by the nearby large chemical plant – the Nitrogen Works in Tarnów-Mościce. In addition to chemical hazards, residents were also terrified by rumours of American long-range missiles targeting the factory – a strategic facility. The monument is intended to present an alternative vision of the past, in which an unspecified but tragically devastating apocalypse has occurred.

The location was deliberately chosen for its seclusion, as Sasnal intends for it to be hidden, eventually overgrown with grass and other vegetation, and ultimately forgotten.

== Reception ==
The sculpture, in keeping with its original intention, looks temporary. As a result, some residents view it merely as material left behind for the construction of the pipeline, and not a work of art. The development was controversial because of its location: it was ideally situated for the failed expansion of the car park at the nearby football and speedway stadium. The monument has attracted attention within academic and artistic circles. References to the work have appeared in academic publications as well as in specialist media covering Polish culture and architecture.

== See also ==
- Found object
- Anti-monumentalism
