= Critical relative humidity =

Property of water-soluble substances

The critical relative humidity (CRH) of a salt is defined as the relative humidity of the surrounding atmosphere (at a certain temperature) at which the material begins to absorb moisture from the atmosphere and below which it will not absorb atmospheric moisture.

When the humidity of the atmosphere is equal to (or is greater than) the critical relative humidity of a sample of salt, the sample will take up water until all of the salt is dissolved to yield a saturated solution. All water-soluble salts and mixtures have characteristic critical humidities; it is a unique material property.

The critical relative humidity of most salts decreases with increasing temperature. For instance, the critical relative humidity of ammonium nitrate decreases 22% with a temperature from 0 °C to 40 °C (32 °F to 104 °F).

The critical relative humidity of several fertilizer salts is given in table 1:

Salt	Critical Relative Humidity (%)
Calcium nitrate	46.7
Ammonium nitrate	59.4
Sodium nitrate	72.4
Urea	72.5
Ammonium chloride	77.2
Ammonium sulfate	79.2
Diammonium phosphate	82.5
Potassium chloride	84.0
Potassium nitrate	90.5
Monoammonium phosphate	91.6
Monocalcium phosphate	93.6
Potassium sulfate	96.3

Table 1: Critical relative humidities of pure salts at 30°C.

Mixtures of salts usually have lower critical humidities than either of the constituents. Fertilizers that contain Urea as an ingredient usually exhibit a much lower Critical Relative Humidity than Fertilizers without Urea. Table 2 shows CRH data for two-component mixtures:

---	Ammonium nitrate	Urea	Ammonium sulfate	Potassium chloride
Ammonium nitrate	59.4	18.1	62.3	67.9
Urea	18.1	72.5	56.4	60.3
Ammonium sulfate	62.3	56.4	79.2	71.3
Potassium chloride	67.9	60.3	71.3	84.0

Table 2: Critical relative humidities of mixtures of salts at 30°C (values are percent relative humidity).

As shown, the effect of salt mixing is most dramatic in the case of ammonium nitrate with urea. This mixture has an extremely low critical relative humidity and can therefore only be used in liquid fertilisers (so called UAN-solutions).

== See also ==
- Deliquescent
- Hygroscopy
- Humidity
