= Grupa Azoty Jednostka Ratownictwa Chemicznego =

Grupa Azoty Jednostka Ratownictwa Chemicznego Sp. z o.o. (abridged name: Grupa Azoty JRCh) - production-service company, a member of the Polskie Konsorcjum Chemiczne sp. z o.o., owned by Grupa Azoty S.A. (former Zakłady Azotowe in Tarnów-Mościce S.A.) seated in Tarnów. Its activity includes, e.g. particularly dangerous works, specialist-rescue services, industrial sewage treatment and utilisation and waste storage (including dangerous waste). The company uses ca. 200 ha of storage yards. It also provides support for fire fighting units in the case of chemical threats.

The company has also four specialist laboratories (Laboratory of Veterinary Diagnostics and Food Product Research in Nowy Sącz, Laboratory of Food Product Research, Laboratory of Environment Protection and Laboratory of Water and Sewage Testing in Tarnów) which are accredited by the Polish Centre for Accreditation and have the Approvals of the Sanitary and Veterinary Inspection. They also perform research in the scope of e.g. harmful and strenuous factors at work positions, chemical and microbiological tests of food and water, surface and air purity as well as hygiene of production processes, sewage, ground waters, swimming pools, bathing sites and sewage sediments, in addition to veterinary diagnostic tests. The laboratories also offer immission and emission measurements as well as soil and precipitation tests.

== Company shareholding structure ==
Grupa Azoty Polskie Konsorcjum Chemiczne sp. z o.o. - 100%.

== Authorities ==
- Leszek Gniadek – president of the management board,
- Agata Gorzkowska-Rams - Member of the Board.

== History ==
In 1968 the Chemical Emergency Station started to operate at Zakłady Azotowe in Tarnów-Mościce S.A. the task of which was to liquidate the threats both in the plants and in railway and road transport.

The unit was separated from the structure of the plants in 1994 and commenced its independent activity as the limited liability company - Jednostka Ratownictwa Chemicznego sp. z o.o. (JRCh sp. z o.o.) - in the scope of the Zakłady Azotowe Capital Group in Tarnów-Mościce S.A. The changes in the structure resulted also in the company development and increase in employment. In 2009, at PLASTPOL fair, the company was granted an award for the “originality and distinguishing style of performance at the fair”, during which it presented a new visual identification.

In relation to the consolidation of the companies of the great chemical synthesis and their dependent companies, on 31 August 2012, the company Grupa Azoty Jednostka Ratownictwa Chemicznego sp. z o.o seated in Tarnów was amalgamated with the company “CHEMZAK” sp. z o.o. seated in Kędzierzyn-Koźle.

The company employs ca. 300 people.
