= Grupa Azoty Automatyka =

Polish design and construction company

Grupa Azoty Automatyka Sp. z o.o. (abridged name: Grupa Azoty AUTOMATYKA) is a Polish design-construction company, a member of Polskie Konsorcjum Chemiczne Capital Group sp. z o.o., owned by Grupa Azoty S.A. (former Zakłady Azotowe in Tarnów-Mościce S.A.), seated in Tarnów. It offers services in the scope of design and construction works, start-up, support and maintenance of measurement and control systems (e.g. automatics and industrial analytics, security systems, radiology and thermal vision) as well as electrical power engineering.

== Company shareholding structure ==
- Grupa Azoty Polskie Konsorcjum Chemiczne Sp. z o.o. - 77.86%.

== Authorities ==
- Artur Maciejczyk – President of the Management Board
- Paweł Głogowski – Chairman of the Supervisory Board.

== History ==
The unit of Zakłady Azotowe in Tarnów-Mościce S.A. - the Unit of Measurement and Automatics - operated from 1927. In 1997 it became Automatyka sp. z o.o. Two years later, in 1999, the units of Automatyka and Elektryka (separated from Zakłady Azotowe “Kędzierzyn” S.A.), established the company Aster ZAK.

In 2011 Grupa Azoty Polskie Konsorcjum Chemiczne Sp. z o.o. took hold of 72% of the shares of Automatyka sp. z o.o. and 100% of the shares of Aster Zak, acquiring the management of the dependent companies of Azoty Tarnów Capital Group. In the scope of restructuring and consolidation of dependent companies, in 2012 Automatyka Sp. z o.o and Aster ZAK merged.

On 19 April 2013 the company's name was changed to Grupa Azoty Automatyka sp. z o.o.

== Awards and distinctions ==
Grupa Azoty Automatyka Sp. z o.o. has been awarded the following prizes and distinctions:

- 2006: Gazele Biznesu;
- 2007: Gazele Biznesu;
- 2008: Gazele Biznesu;
- 2009: Gazele Biznesu, Solidny Pracodawca Małopolski, Gepard Biznesu, Certificate of Business Credibility;
- 2010: Gazele Biznesu, Forbes’ Diament;
- 2011: Gazele Biznesu, Certificate of Business Credibility;
- 2012: Gazele Biznesu, Gepard Biznesu, Certificate of Business Credibility, Skrzydła Biznesu, Dynamiczna Firma;
- 2013: Gazele Biznesu, Gepard Biznesu, Certificate of Business Credibility, Mocna Firma Godna Zaufania, Manager of the year (distinction for the president of the Company Management Board);
- 2014: Certificate of Business Credibility, PCBC Prize for promoting international quality standards, Forbes’ Diament;
- 2015: Trustworthy Company;
- 2016: Trustworthy Company.
