= Zakłady Azotowe Kędzierzyn =

Polish chemical company

ZAK Spółka Akcyjna (ZAK S.A.), now renamed Grupa Azoty Kędzierzyn, is a chemical company based in the city of Kędzierzyn, Opole Voivodeship, southwest Poland.

It is part of the Grupa Azoty chemical companies holding company.

== History ==
On October 20, 2010, Zakłady Azotowe in Tarnów-Mościce became the majority shareholder of ZAK SA by acquiring 52.6% of its shares. On October 13, 2011, the Tarnów company purchased an additional 40.86% of ZAK SA shares, bringing its total ownership to 93.48%. This was part of a broader consolidation effort in the chemical industry, following the acquisition of 66% of the shares of Zakłady Chemiczne "Police" by Zakłady Azotowe in Tarnów-Mościce. This consolidation was finalized with an agreement between Zakłady Azotowe in Tarnów-Mościce and Zakłady Azotowe Puławy. As a result, all companies within the Grupa Azoty underwent a rebranding, and the Kędzierzyn company was renamed Grupa Azoty Zakłady Azotowe Kędzierzyn SA, abbreviated as Grupa Azoty ZAK S.A.

== Products ==
Grupa Azoty Kędzierzyn produces nitrogen fertilizers (16% share of the Polish market), OXO alcohols (the sole producer in Poland, close to 10% share of the European market), and phthalate plasticizers (approximately 73% and 6% share of the domestic and European markets, respectively).

In 2007, the company's consolidated sales revenue amounted to PLN 1.67 billion (€375 million), while the net profit reached PLN 115.3 million (€26 million).
