= José María Asua =

Spanish scientist

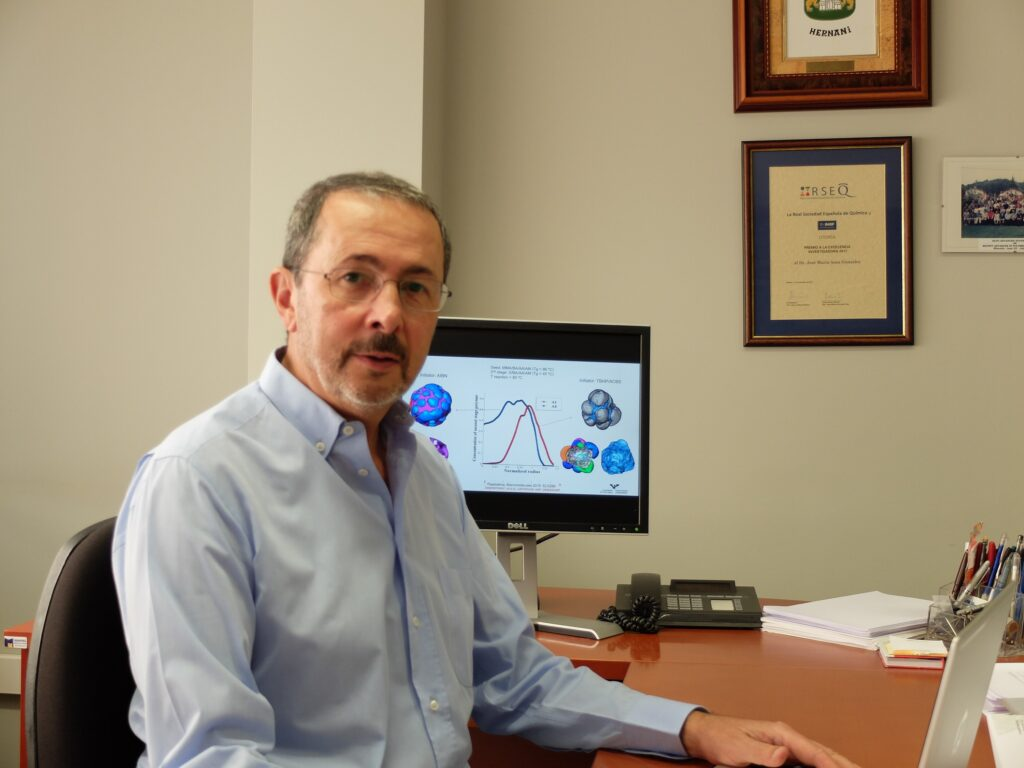
- Asua in 2020
- Born: José María Asua González; 1953 April 6 (73); Zarátamo, Biscay
- Education: Universidad del País Vasco
- Employer: Universidad del País Vasco

José María Asua González (Zarátamo, April 6, 1953) is a Spanish chemist, professor of chemical engineering at the University of the Basque Country and director of Polymat, the Polymeric Materials Research Institute.

Asua obtained his Bachelor's degree in Chemistry from the University of Bilbao in 1975, and completed his PhD in Chemistry at the University of Zaragoza, researching the deactivation of solid catalysts.

== Research and professional career ==
In 1978, he joined the Faculty of Chemical Sciences at the University of the Basque Country to research the subject of polymerization reactors. He completed a post-doctoral stay at the University of Liège (Belgium) investigating the hydrodynamics of trickle bed reactors (TBR), and has spent sabbatical years at Lehigh University (USA) as a Fulbright scholar and at the University of Waterloo (Canada) as a visiting professor.

He is also a visiting professor at the Catholic Universities of Leuven (Belgium) and Dortmund (Germany). Professor Asua has worked in industrially important polymerization processes, developing knowledge-based strategies for the production of water-dispersed polymers. He has also been involved in university-industry relations, directing industrial projects; and has been part of the scientific committee of international conferences and director of a NATO Advanced Study Institute.

== Awards and honors ==
- Award for Research Excellence from the Royal Spanish Society of Chemistry, 2017.
- Professor Martínez Moreno Award for Invention and Research in Applied Chemistry from the University of Seville and the García-Cabrerizo Foundation, 2015.
- Euskadi Research Award, 2005.
- Member of Jakiunde, the Academy of Sciences, Arts and Letters of the Basque Country.
- Rhône Poulenc Award for Innovation in Clean Technologies.

== Publications ==
Asua is the author of a book and editor of the books 'Polymeric Dispersions: Principles and Applications' (1997) and 'Polymer Reaction Engineering' (2007). He has published more than 230 articles and is co-author of 4 patents. He is a member of the editorial boards of Macromolecular Reaction Engineering, Macromolecular Materials and Engineering and Chemical Engineering Journal, and has been Associate Editor of Polymer Reaction Engineering. He has directed 33 doctoral theses.
