= Grzybów, Gmina Staszów =

Grzybów
- Village
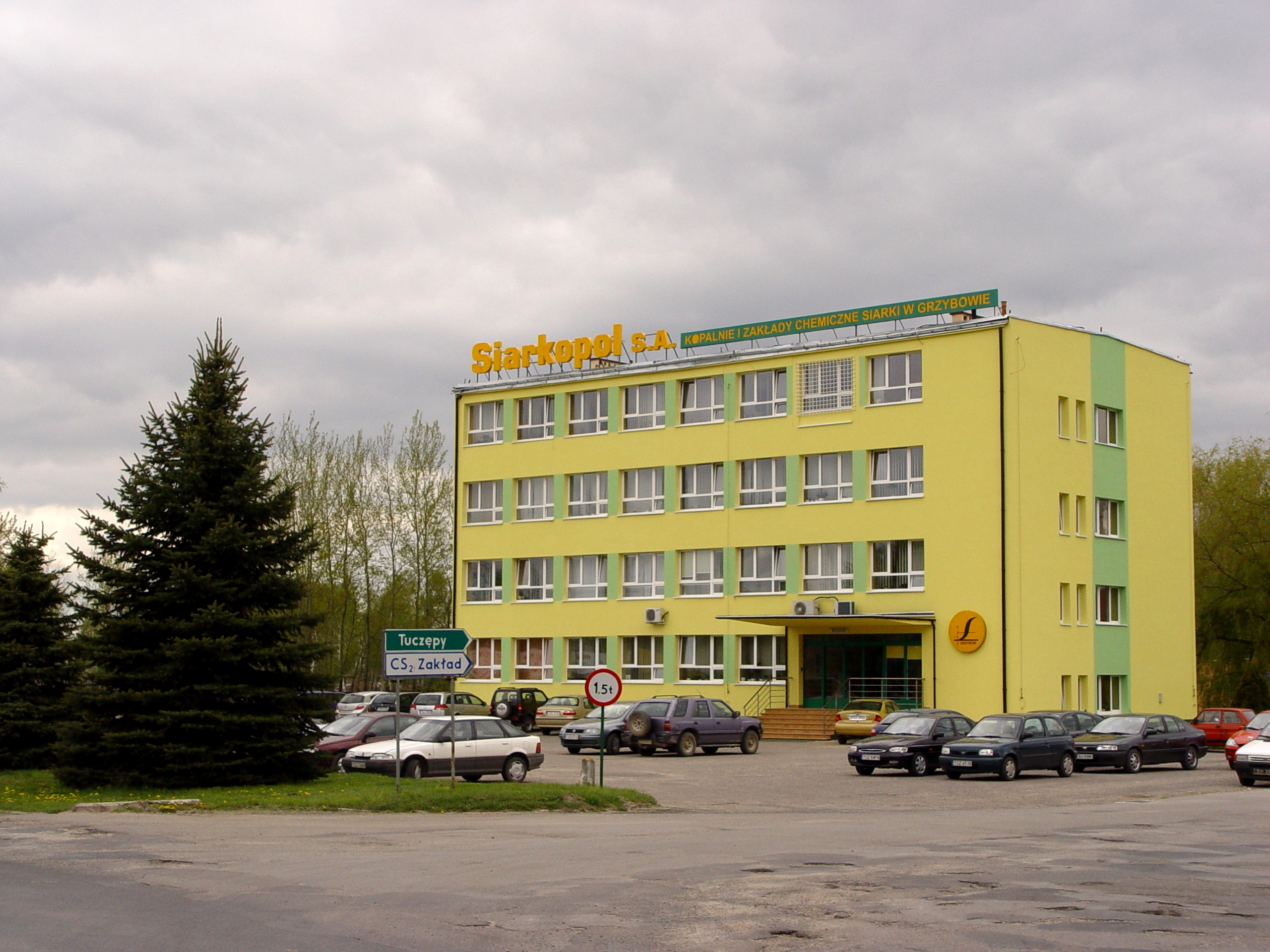

- Location within Poland
- Coordinates: 50°32′05″N 21°05′41″E
- Country: Poland
- Voivodeship: Świętokrzyskie
- County: Staszów
- Gmina: Staszów
- Sołectwo: Grzybów
- Elevation: 214.5 m (704 ft)

Population (31 December 2009 at Census)
  - Total: ▼228
- Time zone: UTC+1 (CET)
  - Summer (DST): UTC+2 (CEST)
- Postal code: 28-200
- Area code: +48 15
- Car plates: TSZ

Grzybów [ˈɡʐɨbuf] is a village in the administrative district of Gmina Staszów, within Staszów County, Świętokrzyskie Voivodeship, in south-central Poland. It lies approximately 6 km (4 mi) south-west of Staszów and 52 km (32 mi) south-east of the regional capital Kielce.
