= Oxo alcohol =

Group of chemical compounds

Oxo alcohols are alcohols that are prepared by adding carbon monoxide (CO) and hydrogen (usually combined as synthesis gas) to an olefin to obtain an aldehyde using the hydroformylation reaction and then hydrogenating the aldehyde to obtain the alcohol. An intermediate step of adding two aldehydes together to obtain a larger aldehyde (the aldol condensation reaction) can precede the hydrogenation. Long chain oxo-alcohols are often prepared using alpha-olefins from the Shell higher olefin process, to give secondary alcohols such as isodecyl alcohol.

Key oxo alcohols that are sold in commerce include the following:

- 2-Methyl-2-butanol (2M2B)
- n-Butanol
- 2-Ethylhexanol
- 2-Propylheptanol
- Isononyl alcohol
- Isodecyl alcohol

Key manufacturers of oxo alcohols include the following companies:

- BASF
- Dow Chemical Company
- Eastman Chemical Company
- ExxonMobil
- Grupa Azoty
- Petronas
- Sasol
- SABIC

Oxo alcohols are used as solvents and are reacted with phthalic anhydride to form phthalates, which find use in commerce as vinyl plasticizers.

== See also ==
- Guerbet reaction - gives similar branched alcohols
