= UAN =

Solution of urea and ammonium nitrate in water used as a fertilizer

UAN is a solution of urea and ammonium nitrate in water used as a fertilizer. The combination of urea and ammonium nitrate has an extremely low critical relative humidity (18% at 30 °C) and can therefore only be used in liquid fertilizers. The most commonly used grade of these fertilizer solutions is UAN 32.0.0 (32%N) known as UN32 or UN-32, which consists of 45% ammonium nitrate, 35% urea and only 20% water. Other grades are UAN 28, UAN 30 and UAN 18. The solutions are quite corrosive towards mild steel (up to 0.5 inches (1.3 cm) per year on C1010 steel) and are therefore generally equipped with a corrosion inhibitor to protect tanks, pipelines, nozzles, etc. Urea–ammonium nitrate solutions should not be combined with calcium ammonium nitrate (CAN-17) or other solutions prepared from calcium nitrate. A thick, milky-white insoluble precipitate forms that may plug nozzles.

== Physical and chemical characteristics of urea ammonium nitrate solutions ==
The solutions contain a remarkably low amount of water and nevertheless have a low salt-out temperature:

Physical and Chemical Characteristics of UAN Solutions
Grade, N%	28	30	32
Ammonium nitrate (%):	40	42	45
Urea (%):	30	33	35
Water (%):	30	25	20
Specific gravity at 16 °C:	1.283	1.303	1.320
Salt-out temperature (°C):	-18	-10	-2

== See also ==
- Urea nitrate
- Nitrourea
