= Zakłady Azotowe Puławy =

Polish chemical company

Grupa azoty Zakłady Azotowe "Puławy"
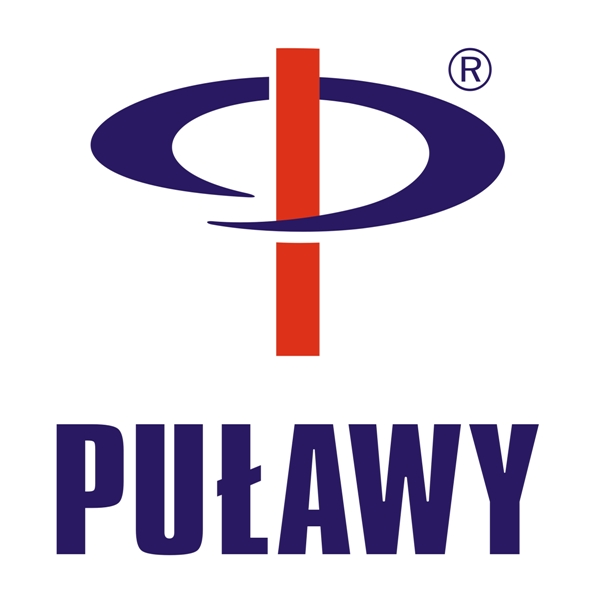
- Company type: Joint-stock company
- Traded as: Warsaw Stock Exchange (GPW)
- Industry: Chemicals
- Founded: 1966
- Headquarters: Puławy, Poland
- Area served: Worldwide
- Key people: Jacek Janiszek (President)
- Products: Chemicals, Nitrogen fertilizers: ammonium nitrate, urea, UAN, ammonium sulfate, monomer: melamine, caprolactam, hydrogen peroxide, AdBlue gases.
- Revenue: 2 882 320 000 PLN (holding, financial year 2010/2011)
- Net income: 226 068 000 PLN (net, holding, financial year 2010/2011)
- Website: pulawy.com (in Polish)

Grupa Azoty Zakłady Azotowe "Puławy" PLC is a Polish chemical company based in Puławy, Lublin Voivodeship, specializing in the production of mono-volumes of nitrogen fertilizer (ammonium nitrate, urea, UAN, ammonium sulfate), one of the world's largest producers of melamine. It also produces caprolactam, hydrogen peroxide, AdBlue and technical gases.

Since January 2013, it has been part of Grupa Azoty.

== History ==
=== Polish People's Republic (PRL) Period ===
The decision to build plants producing Nitrogen fertilizer in Puławy, was taken on December 19, 1960. It took nearly 5 years to build the plant. Ammonia and urea's production was finally launched on 4 December 1966. In the years 1967–1970, production of carbon dioxide and dry ice has been started.

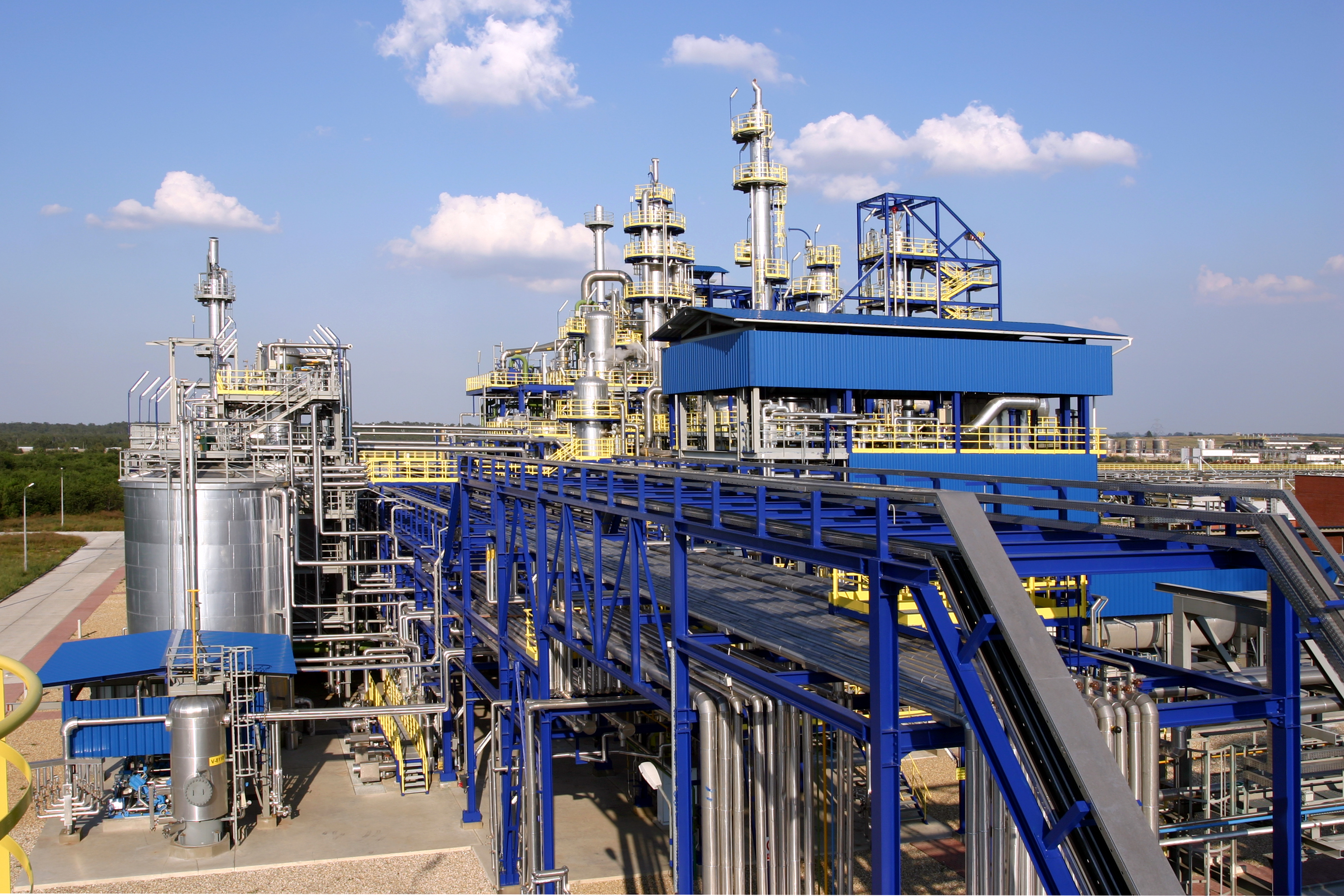
Grupa Azoty Zakłady Azotowe "Puławy"

In 1970 it was decided to build a caprolactam plant, and from 1975 to 1977, the first production line of melamine has been started.

In the 1980s, the company made progress in reducing the works’ nuisance for the natural environment. The wastewater treatment plant was built right by the production line of caprolactam. At the same time, the range of artificial fertilizers was being improved. The two-component fertilizer, urea ammonium nitrate RSM (UAN) was put into production for the first time.

=== Third Republic of Poland Period ===
On 1 September 1992, plants have been transformed into a Limited Liability Company and acquired its current name. On 14 November 1995, the production line of hydrogen peroxide was launched. On 15 December 1998, the company started the work on the installation producing sodium ortooksoboran (PBS). What is more, old production lines of urea and ammonia were modernized.

In the years 2000–2004, two new production lines of melamine were launched in collaboration with Eurotecnica, so plant reached 10% share in world production of this compound.

By 2005, the Treasury was the owner of the factory, holding 99,99% shares of the company. In 2005, the company was privatized by issuing shares on the Warsaw Stock Exchange; however, the Treasury remained the owner of a controlling interest.

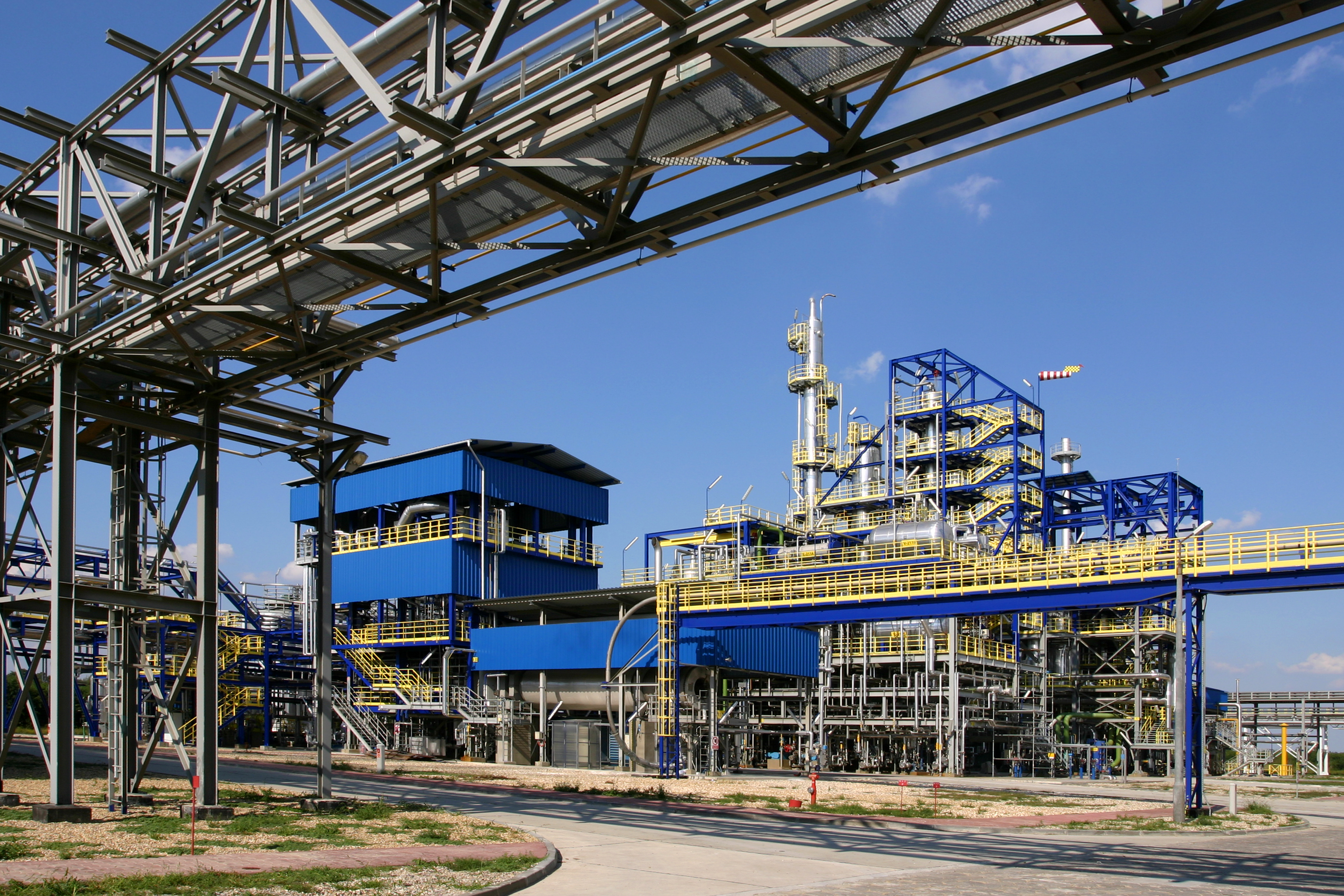
Production warehouse in Grupa Azoty Zakłady Azotowe PUŁAWY PLC

In 2008, Zaklady Azotowe "Puławy" PLC were authorized to engage the economic activity in the special economic zone to increase urea production capacity of about 270 thousand tons a year and Ad Blue to 100 thousand tons a year.

In 2011, the company acquired 98.43% of shares in Gdańsk Phosphate Fertilizer Plant "Fosfory" LTD, extending the commercial offer of phosphate fertilizers and compound fertilizers.

In 2012, the company acquired 85% of shares in chemical plants Chorzów Adipol-Azoty PLC, extending the commercial offer of such potassium nitrate, calcium nitrate and chemical food additives.

== Authorities ==
=== Management ===
- Jacek Janiszek – President of the Management board
- Krzysztof Homenda – Vice-president of the Management board
- Paweł Owczarski – Vice-president of the Management board
- Izabela Małgorzata Świderek – Vice-president of the Management board
- Andrzej Skwarek – Member of the Management board

=== Supervisory Board ===
- Jacek Nieścior – chairman of the Supervisory Board
- Maciej Marzec – member of the Supervisory Board
- Wiktor Cwynar – secretary of the Supervisory Board
- Grzegorz Mandziarz – member of the Supervisory Board
- Jacek Wójtowicz – member of the Supervisory Board
- Krzysztof Bednarz – member of the Supervisory Board

== Production capacity ==
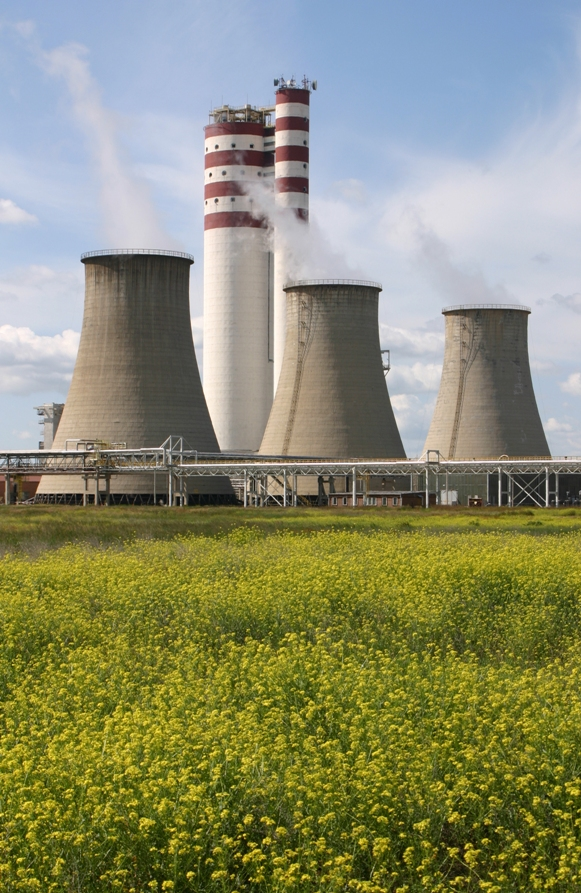
Grupa Azoty Zakłady Azotowe "Puławy"

The annual production capacity of the plant in 2011 was as follows:

- urea – 1 215 000 tons
- ammonium nitrate – 1 103 850 tons
- UAN (RSM) – 1 000 000 tons
- ammonium sulfate – 156 000 tons
- AdBlue – 100 000 tons
- melamine – 92 000 tons
- caprolactam – 70 000 tons
- hydrogen peroxide – 10 000 tons
- liquefied carbon dioxide – 74 250 tons

== Organizational structure ==
=== Subsidiaries ===
- Phosphate Fertilizer Plant In Gdańsk "Fosfory" Sp z o.o. – 98,45%
- Azoty-Adipol PLC – fertilizers and chemicals production and logistics services – 85,00%
- Prozap Sp z o.o. – engineering services - 84,69%
- Remzap Sp z o.o. – repair services - 94,61%
- Medical Sp.z o.o. – healthcare services - 91,41%
- Jawor Sp z o.o. – hotel services - 99,96%
- Sto-Zap Sp z o.o. – catering services - 96,15%
- Melamina III Sp z o.o. – energy project - 100,00%

=== Affiliated entities ===
- BBM Sp z o.o. – marine export terminal – 50,00%
- CTL Kolzap Sp z o.o. – siding services – 49,00%
- Navitrans Sp.z o.o. – shipping services – 26,45%
- Technochimservis – commercial services – 25,00%

== Sports clubs ==
Zakłady Azotowe "Puławy" are currently sponsoring a handball club KS Azoty-Puławy formed in 2003, by subtracting from the club Wisła Puławy, playing in the Polish Superliga. It also supports the multi sectional club Wisła Puławy, represented by the swimmer Konrad Czerniak. During the season 2010/11 the players of Puławy's football club managed to win the promotion to the second division.
