= Polyaddition =

Polymer formation through individual independent addition reactions

IUPAC definition

Polyaddition A polymerization in which the growth of polymer chains proceeds by addition reactions between molecules of all degrees of polymerization. Notes: 1. The growth steps are expressed by: P_{x}+P_{y} → P_{x+y} {x}∈{1,2,…∞};{y}∈{1,2,…∞}

where P_{x} and P_{y} denote chains of degrees of polymerization x and y, respectively.

2. The earlier term "addition polymerization" embraced both the current concepts of "polyaddition" and "chain polymerization," but did not include "condensative chain polymerization."

Polyaddition (or addition polymerization) is a polymerization reaction that forms polymers via individual independent addition reactions. Polyaddition occurs as a reaction between functional groups on molecules with low degrees of polymerization, such as dimers, trimers, and oligomers, to form species of higher molar mass. Only at nearly complete conversions does the polymer form, as in polycondensation and in contrast to chain polymerization.

A typical polyaddition is the formation of a polyurethane.

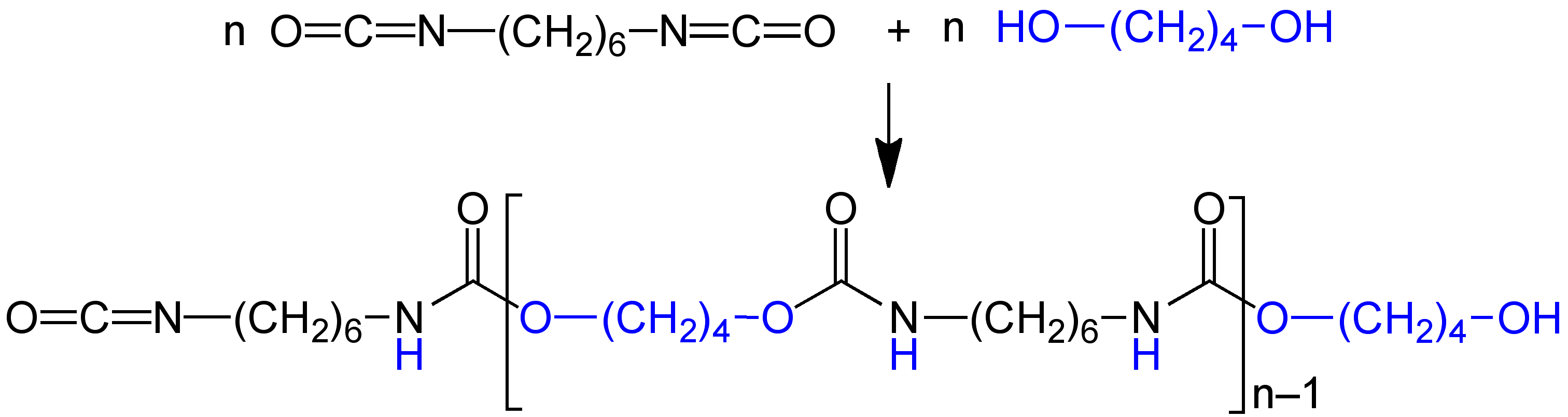
