= Condensation polymer =

Polymer produced via a condensation reaction

Polyethylene terephthalate (PET) is a common condensation polymer.

In polymer chemistry, condensation polymers are any kind of polymers whose process of polymerization involves a condensation reaction (i.e. a small molecule, such as water or methanol, is produced as a byproduct). Natural proteins as well as some common plastics such as nylon and PETE are formed in this way. Condensation polymers are formed by polycondensation, when the polymer is formed by condensation reactions between species of all degrees of polymerization, or by condensative chain polymerization, when the polymer is formed by sequential addition of monomers to an active site in a chain reaction. The main alternative forms of polymerization are chain polymerization and polyaddition, both of which give addition polymers.

IUPAC definition

Polycondensation: a polymerization in which the growth of polymer chains proceeds by condensation reactions between molecules of all degrees of polymerization. Notes:

1. The growth steps are expressed by:
  P_{x} + P_{y} → P_{x+y} + L (x, y = 1, 2, …)
  where P_{x} and P_{y} denote chains of degrees of polymerization x and y, respectively, and L a low-molar-mass by-product.
2. The earlier term 'polycondensation' was synonymous with 'condensation polymerization'. The current definitions of polycondensation and condensative chain polymerization were both embraced by the earlier term 'polycondensation'.

Condensation polymerization is a form of step-growth polymerization. Linear polymers are produced from bifunctional monomers, i.e. compounds with two reactive end-groups. Common condensation polymers include polyesters, polyamides such as nylon, polyacetals, and proteins.

== Polyamides ==
One important class of condensation polymers are polyamides. They arise from the reaction of carboxylic acid and an amine. Examples include nylons and proteins. When prepared from amino-carboxylic acids, e.g. amino acids, the stoichiometry of the polymerization includes co-formation of water:

n H_{2}N-X-CO_{2}H → [HN-X-C(O)]_{n} + (n-1) H_{2}O

When prepared from diamines and dicarboxylic acids, e.g. the production of nylon 66, the polymerization produces two molecules of water per repeat unit:

n H_{2}N-X-NH_{2} + n HO_{2}C-Y-CO_{2}H → [HN-X-NHC(O)-Y-C(O)]_{n} + (2n-1) H_{2}O

General chemical structure of one type of condensation polymer

== Polyesters ==
Another important class of condensation polymers are polyesters. They arise from the reaction of a carboxylic acid and an alcohol. An example is polyethyleneterephthalate, the common plastic PET (recycling #1 in the USA):

n HO-X-OH + n HO_{2}C-Y-CO_{2}H → [O-X-O_{2}C-Y-C(O)]_{n} + (2n-1) H_{2}O

Structure of poly-(R)-3-hydroxybutyrate (P3HB), a naturally-occurring polymer.

== Safety and environmental considerations ==
Condensation polymers tend to be more biodegradable than addition polymers. The peptide or ester bonds between monomers can be hydrolysed, especially in the presence of catalysts or bacterial enzymes.

== See also ==
- Biopolymer
- Epoxy resins
- Polyamide
- Polyester
