= Molecular mass =

Mass of a given molecule in daltons

The molecular mass (m) is the mass of a given molecule, often expressed in units of daltons (Da). Different molecules of the same compound may have different molecular masses because they contain different isotopes of an element. The derived quantity relative molecular mass is the unitless ratio of the mass of a molecule to the atomic mass constant (which is equal to one dalton).

The molecular mass and relative molecular mass are distinct from but related to the molar mass. The molar mass is defined as the mass of a given substance divided by the amount of the substance, and is expressed in grams per mole (g/mol). That makes the molar mass an average of many particles or molecules (weighted by abundance of the isotopes), and the molecular mass the mass of one specific particle or molecule. The molar mass is usually the more appropriate quantity when dealing with macroscopic (weigh-able) quantities of a substance.

The definition of molecular weight is most authoritatively synonymous with relative molecular mass, which is dimensionless; however, in common practice, use of this terminology is highly variable. When the molecular weight is given with the unit Da, it is frequently as a weighted average (by abundance) similar to the molar mass but with different units. In molecular biology and biochemistry, the mass of macromolecules is referred to as their molecular weight and is expressed in kilodaltons (kDa), although the numerical value is often approximate and representative of an average.

The terms "molecular mass", "molecular weight", and "molar mass" may be used interchangeably in less formal contexts where unit- and quantity-correctness is not needed. The molecular mass is more commonly used when referring to the mass of a single or specific well-defined molecule and less commonly than molecular weight when referring to a weighted average of a sample. Prior to the 2019 revision of the SI, quantities expressed in daltons (Da) were by definition numerically equivalent to molar mass expressed in the units g/mol and were thus strictly numerically interchangeable. After the 2019 revision, this relationship is only approximate, but the equivalence may still be assumed for all practical purposes.

The molecular mass of small to medium size molecules, measured by mass spectrometry, can be used to determine the composition of elements in the molecule. The molecular masses of macromolecules, such as proteins, can also be determined by mass spectrometry; however, methods based on viscosity and light-scattering are also used to determine molecular mass when crystallographic or mass spectrometric data are not available.

== Calculation ==
Molecular masses are calculated from the atomic masses of each nuclide present in the molecule, while molar masses and relative molecular masses (molecular weights) are calculated from the standard atomic weights of each element. The standard atomic weight takes into account the isotopic distribution of the element in a given sample (usually assumed to be "normal"). For example, water has a molar mass of 18.0153(3) g/mol, but individual water molecules have molecular masses between 18.010 564 6863(15) Da (^{1}H_{2}^{16}O) and 22.027 7364(9) Da (^{2}H_{2}^{18}O).

Atomic and molecular masses are usually reported in daltons, which is defined in terms of the mass of the isotope ^{12}C (carbon-12). However, the name unified atomic mass unit (u) is still used in common practice. Relative atomic and molecular masses as defined are dimensionless. Molar masses when expressed in g/mol have almost identical numerical values as relative atomic and molecular masses. For example, the molar mass and molecular mass of methane, whose molecular formula is CH_{4}, are calculated respectively as follows:

Molar mass of CH_{4}
	Standard atomic weight	Number of atoms	Total molar mass (g/mol) or molecular weight (unitless)
C	12.011	1	12.011
H	1.008	4	4.032
CH_{4}			16.043
Molecular mass of ^{12}C^{1}H_{4}
	Nuclide mass (Da or u)	Number of atoms	Total molecular mass (Da or u)
^{12}C	12.0000	1	12.0000
^{1}H	1.007825	4	4.0313
CH_{4}			16.0313

The uncertainty in molecular mass reflects variance (error) in measurement not the natural variance in isotopic abundances across the globe. In high-resolution mass spectrometry the mass isotopomers ^{12}C^{1}H_{4} and ^{13}C^{1}H_{4} are observed as distinct molecules, with molecular masses of approximately 16.031 Da and 17.035 Da, respectively. The intensity of the mass-spectrometry peaks is proportional to the isotopic abundances in the molecular species. ^{12}C ^{2}H ^{1}H_{3} can also be observed with molecular mass of 17 Da.

== Determination ==
=== Mass spectrometry ===
In mass spectrometry, the molecular mass of a small molecule is usually reported as the monoisotopic mass: that is, the mass of the molecule containing only the most common isotope of each element. This also differs subtly from the molecular mass in that the choice of isotopes is defined and thus is a single specific molecular mass out of the (perhaps many) possibilities. The masses used to compute the monoisotopic molecular mass are found in a table of isotopic masses and are not found in a typical periodic table. The average molecular mass is often used for larger molecules, since molecules with many atoms are often unlikely to be composed exclusively of the most abundant isotope of each element. A theoretical average molecular mass can be calculated using the standard atomic weights found in a typical periodic table. The average molecular mass of a very small sample, however, might differ substantially from this since a single sample average is not the same as the average of many geographically distributed samples.

=== Mass photometry ===
Mass photometry is a rapid, in-solution, label-free method of obtaining the molecular mass of proteins, lipids, sugars and nucleic acids at the single-molecule level. The technique is based on interferometric scattered light microscopy. Contrast from scattered light by a single binding event at the interface between the protein solution and glass slide is detected and is linearly proportional to the mass of the molecule. This technique can also be used to measure sample homogeneity, to detect protein oligomerisation states, and to identify complex macromolecular assemblies (ribosomes, GroEL, AAV) and protein interactions such as protein-protein interactions. Mass photometry can accurately measure molecular mass over a wide range of molecular masses (40 kDa – 5 MDa).

=== Hydrodynamic methods ===
To a first approximation, the basis for determination of molecular mass according to Mark–Houwink relations is the fact that the intrinsic viscosity of solutions (or suspensions) of macromolecules depends on volumetric proportion of the dispersed particles in a particular solvent. Specifically, the hydrodynamic size as related to molecular mass depends on a conversion factor, describing the shape of a particular molecule. This allows the apparent molecular mass to be described from a range of techniques sensitive to hydrodynamic effects, including DLS, SEC (also known as GPC when the eluent is an organic solvent), viscometry, and diffusion ordered nuclear magnetic resonance spectroscopy (DOSY). The apparent hydrodynamic size can then be used to approximate molecular mass using a series of macromolecule-specific standards. As this requires calibration, it's frequently described as a "relative" molecular mass determination method.

=== Static light scattering ===
It is also possible to determine absolute molecular mass directly from light scattering, traditionally using the Zimm method. This can be accomplished either via classical static light scattering or via multi-angle light scattering detectors. Molecular masses determined by this method do not require calibration, hence the term "absolute". The only external measurement required is refractive index increment, which describes the change in refractive index with concentration.

== See also ==
- Cryoscopy and cryoscopic constant
- Ebullioscopy and ebullioscopic constant
- Dumas method of molecular weight determination
- François-Marie Raoult
- Standard atomic weight
- Mass number
- Absolute molar mass
- Molar mass distribution
- Dalton (unit)
- SDS-PAGE
