= Colligative properties =

Properties of solutions that depend only on the number of solute particles

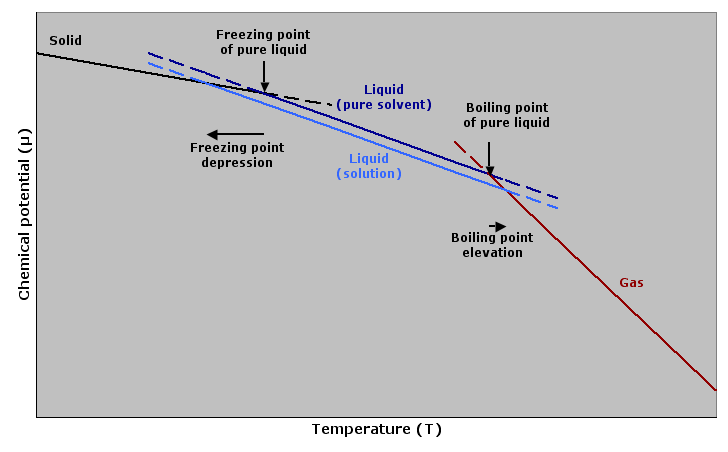
Freezing point depression and boiling point elevation

In chemistry, colligative properties are those properties of solutions that depend on the ratio of the number of solute particles to the number of solvent particles in a solution, and not on the nature of the chemical species present. The number ratio can be related to the various units for concentration of a solution such as molarity, molality, normality, etc.

The assumption that solution properties are independent of nature of solute particles is exact only for ideal solutions, which are solutions that exhibit thermodynamic properties analogous to those of an ideal gas, and is approximate for dilute real solutions. In other words, colligative properties are a set of solution properties that can be reasonably approximated by the assumption that the solution is ideal.

Only properties which result from the dissolution of a nonvolatile solute in a volatile liquid solvent are considered. They are essentially solvent properties which are changed by the presence of the solute. The solute particles displace some solvent molecules in the liquid phase and thereby reduce the concentration of solvent and increase its entropy, so that the colligative properties are independent of the nature of the solute. The word colligative is derived from the Latin colligatus meaning bound together. This indicates that all colligative properties have a common feature, namely that they are related only to the number of solute molecules relative to the number of solvent molecules and not to the nature of the solute.

Colligative properties include:

- Relative lowering of vapor pressure (Raoult's law)
- Elevation of boiling point
- Depression of freezing point
- Osmotic pressure

For a given solute-solvent mass ratio, all colligative properties are inversely proportional to solute molar mass.

Measurement of colligative properties for a dilute solution of a non-ionized solute such as urea or glucose in water or another solvent can lead to determinations of relative molar masses, both for small molecules and for polymers which cannot be studied by other means. Alternatively, measurements for ionized solutes can lead to an estimation of the percentage of dissociation taking place.

Colligative properties are studied mostly for dilute solutions, whose behavior may be approximated as that of an ideal solution. In fact, all of the properties listed above are colligative only in the dilute limit: at higher concentrations, the freezing point depression, boiling point elevation, vapor pressure elevation or depression, and osmotic pressure are all dependent on the chemical nature of the solvent and the solute.

== Relative lowering of vapor pressure ==
A vapor is a substance in a gaseous state at a temperature lower than its critical point. Vapor pressure is the pressure exerted by a vapor in thermodynamic equilibrium with its solid or liquid state. The vapor pressure of a solvent is lowered when a non-volatile solute is dissolved in it to form a solution.

For an ideal solution, the equilibrium vapor pressure is given by Raoult's law as
$$p = p^{\star}_{\rm A} x_{\rm A} + p^{\star}_{\rm B} x_{\rm B} + \cdots,$$
where $p^{\star}_{\rm i}$ is the vapor pressure of the pure component (i= A, B, ...) and $x_{\rm i}$ is the mole fraction of the component in the solution.

For a solution with a solvent (A) and one non-volatile solute (B), $p^{\star}_{\rm B} = 0$ and $p = p^{\star}_{\rm A} x_{\rm A}$.

The vapor pressure lowering relative to pure solvent is $\Delta p = p^{\star}_{\rm A} - p = p^{\star}_{\rm A} (1 - x_{\rm A}) = p^{\star}_{\rm A} x_{\rm B}$, which is proportional to the mole fraction of solute.

If the solute dissociates in solution, then the number of moles of solute is increased by the van 't Hoff factor $i$, which represents the true number of solute particles for each formula unit. For example, the strong electrolyte MgCl_{2} dissociates into one Mg^{2+} ion and two Cl^{−} ions, so that if ionization is complete, i = 3 and $\Delta p = p^{\star}_{\rm A} x_{\rm B}$, where $x_{\rm B}$ is calculated with moles of solute i times initial moles and moles of solvent same as initial moles of solvent before dissociation. The measured colligative properties show that i is somewhat less than 3 due to ion association.

== Boiling point and freezing point ==
Addition of solute to form a solution stabilizes the solvent in the liquid phase, and lowers the solvent's chemical potential so that solvent molecules have less tendency to move to the gas or solid phases. As a result, liquid solutions slightly above the solvent boiling point at a given pressure become stable, which means that the boiling point increases. Similarly, liquid solutions slightly below the solvent freezing point become stable meaning that the freezing point decreases. Both the boiling point elevation and the freezing point depression are proportional to the lowering of vapor pressure in a dilute solution.

These properties are colligative in systems where the solute is essentially confined to the liquid phase. Boiling point elevation (like vapor pressure lowering) is colligative for non-volatile solutes where the solute presence in the gas phase is negligible. Freezing point depression is colligative for most solutes since very few solutes dissolve appreciably in solid solvents.

=== Boiling point elevation (ebullioscopy) ===
The boiling point of a liquid at a given external pressure is the temperature ($T_{\rm b}$) at which the vapor pressure of the liquid equals the external pressure. The normal boiling point is the boiling point at a pressure equal to 1 atm.

The boiling point of a pure solvent is increased by the addition of a non-volatile solute, and the elevation can be measured by ebullioscopy. It is found that

$\Delta T_{\rm b} = T_{\rm b,\text{solution}} - T_{\rm b,\text{pure solvent}} = i\cdot K_b \cdot m$

Here i is the van 't Hoff factor as above, K_{b} is the ebullioscopic constant of the solvent (equal to 0.512 °C kg/mol for water), and m is the molality of the solution.

The boiling point is the temperature at which there is equilibrium between liquid and gas phases. At the boiling point, the number of gas molecules condensing to liquid equals the number of liquid molecules evaporating to gas. Adding a solute dilutes the concentration of the liquid molecules and reduces the rate of evaporation. To compensate for this and re-attain equilibrium, the boiling point occurs at a higher temperature.

If the solution is assumed to be an ideal solution, K_{b} can be evaluated from the thermodynamic condition for liquid-vapor equilibrium. At the boiling point, the chemical potential μ_{A} of the solvent in the solution phase equals the chemical potential in the pure vapor phase above the solution.

$$\mu _A(T_b)  = \mu_A^{\star}(T_b)  + RT\ln x_A\  = \mu_A^{\star}(g, 1 \,\mathrm{atm}),$$

The asterisks indicate pure phases. This leads to the result $K_b = RMT_b^2/\Delta H_{\mathrm{vap}}$, where R is the molar gas constant, M is the solvent molar mass and ΔH_{vap} is the solvent molar enthalpy of vaporization.

=== Freezing point depression (cryoscopy) ===
The freezing point ($T_{\rm f}$) of a pure solvent is lowered by the addition of a solute which is insoluble in the solid solvent, and the measurement of this difference is called cryoscopy. It is found that

$\Delta T_{\rm f} = T_{\rm f,\text{solution}} - T_{\rm f,\text{pure solvent}} = - i\cdot K_f \cdot m$ (which can also be written as $\Delta T_{\rm f} = T_{\rm f,\text{pure solvent}} - T_{\rm f,\text{solution}} = i\cdot K_f \cdot m$)

Here K_{f} is the cryoscopic constant (equal to 1.86 °C kg/mol for the freezing point of water), i is the van 't Hoff factor, and m the molality (in mol/kg). This predicts the melting of ice by road salt.

In the liquid solution, the solvent is diluted by the addition of a solute, so that fewer molecules are available to freeze. Re-establishment of equilibrium is achieved at a lower temperature at which the rate of freezing becomes equal to the rate of liquefying. At the lower freezing point, the vapor pressure of the liquid is equal to the vapor pressure of the corresponding solid, and the chemical potentials of the two phases are equal as well. The equality of chemical potentials permits the evaluation of the cryoscopic constant as $K_f = RMT_f^2/\Delta_{\mathrm{fus}}H$, where Δ_{fus}H is the solvent molar enthalpy of fusion.

== Osmotic pressure ==
The osmotic pressure of a solution is the difference in pressure between the solution and the pure liquid solvent when the two are in equilibrium across a semipermeable membrane, which allows the passage of solvent molecules but not of solute particles. If the two phases are at the same initial pressure, there is a net transfer of solvent across the membrane into the solution known as osmosis. The process stops and equilibrium is attained when the pressure difference equals the osmotic pressure.

Two laws governing the osmotic pressure of a dilute solution were discovered by the German botanist W. F. P. Pfeffer and the Dutch chemist J. H. van't Hoff:

1. The osmotic pressure of a dilute solution at constant temperature is directly proportional to its concentration.
2. The osmotic pressure of a solution is directly proportional to its absolute temperature.

These are analogous to Boyle's law and Charles's law for gases. Similarly, the combined ideal gas law, $PV = nRT$, has as an analogue for ideal solutions $\Pi V = n R T i$, where $\Pi$ is osmotic pressure; V is the volume; n is the number of moles of solute; R is the molar gas constant 8.314 J K^{−1} mol^{−1}; T is absolute temperature; and i is the Van 't Hoff factor.

The osmotic pressure is then proportional to the molar concentration $c = n/V$, since

$$\Pi = \frac {n R T i}{V} = c R T i$$

The osmotic pressure is proportional to the concentration of solute particles ci and is therefore a colligative property.

As with the other colligative properties, this equation is a consequence of the equality of solvent chemical potentials of the two phases in equilibrium. In this case the phases are the pure solvent at pressure P and the solution at total pressure (P + $\Pi$).

== History ==
The word colligative (Latin: co, ligare) was introduced in 1891 by Wilhelm Ostwald. Ostwald classified solute properties in three categories:

1. colligative properties, which depend only on solute concentration and temperature and are independent of the nature of the solute particles
2. additive properties such as mass, which are the sums of properties of the constituent particles and therefore depend also on the composition (or molecular formula) of the solute, and
3. constitutional properties, which depend further on the molecular structure of the given solute.
