= List of thermodynamic properties =

In thermodynamics, a physical property is any property that is measurable, and whose value describes a state of a physical system. Thermodynamic properties are defined as characteristic features of a system, capable of specifying the system's state. Some constants, such as the ideal gas constant, R, do not describe the state of a system, and so are not properties. On the other hand, some constants, such as K_{f} (the freezing point depression constant, or cryoscopic constant), depend on the identity of a substance, and so may be considered to describe the state of a system, and therefore may be considered physical properties.

"Specific" properties are expressed on a per mass basis. If the units were changed from per mass to, for example, per mole, the property would remain as it was (i.e., intensive or extensive).

== Regarding work and heat ==
Work and heat are not thermodynamic properties, but rather process quantities: flows of energy across a system boundary. Systems do not contain work, but can perform work, and likewise, in formal thermodynamics, systems do not contain heat, but can transfer heat. Informally, however, a difference in the energy of a system that occurs solely because of a difference in its temperature is commonly called heat, and the energy that flows across a boundary as a result of a temperature difference is "heat".

Altitude (or elevation) is usually not a thermodynamic property. Altitude can help specify the location of a system, but that does not describe the state of the system. An exception would be if the effect of gravity need to be considered in order to describe a state, in which case altitude could indeed be a thermodynamic property.

Thermodynamic properties and their characteristics
Property	Symbol	Units	Extensive?	Intensive?	Conjugate	Potential?
Activity	a	–		✓		
Chemical potential	μ_{i}	kJ/mol		✓	Particle number N_{i}	
Compressibility (adiabatic)	β_{S}, κ	Pa^{−1}		✓		
Compressibility (isothermal)	β_{T}, κ	Pa^{−1}		✓		
Cryoscopic constant	K_{f}	K·kg/mol		✓		
Density	ρ	kg/m^{3}		✓		
Ebullioscopic constant	K_{b}	K·kg/mol		✓		
Enthalpy	H	J	✓			✓
Specific enthalpy	h	J/kg		✓		
Entropy	S	J/K	✓		Temperature T	✓ (entropic)
Specific entropy	s	J/(kg K)		✓		
Fugacity	f	N/m^{2}		✓		
Gibbs free energy	G	J	✓			✓
Specific Gibbs free energy	g	J/kg		✓		
Gibbs free entropy	Ξ	J/K	✓			✓ (entropic)
Grand / Landau potential	Ω	J	✓			✓
Heat capacity (constant pressure)	C_{p}	J/K	✓			
Specific heat capacity (constant pressure)	c_{p}	J/(kg·K)		✓		
Heat capacity (constant volume)	C_{v}	J/K	✓			
Specific heat capacity (constant volume)	c_{v}	J/(kg·K)		✓		
Helmholtz free energy	A, F	J	✓			✓
Helmholtz free entropy	Φ	J/K	✓			✓ (entropic)
Internal energy	U	J	✓			✓
Specific internal energy	u	J/kg		✓		
Internal pressure	π_{T}	Pa		✓		
Mass	m	kg	✓			
Particle number	N_{i}	–	✓		Chemical potential μ_{i}	
Pressure	p	Pa		✓	Volume V	
Temperature	T	K		✓	Entropy S	
Thermal conductivity	k	W/(m·K)		✓		
Thermal diffusivity	α	m^{2}/s		✓		
Thermal expansion (linear)	α_{L}	K^{−1}		✓		
Thermal expansion (area)	α_{A}	K^{−1}		✓		
Thermal expansion (volumetric)	α_{V}	K^{−1}		✓		
Vapor quality	χ	–		✓		
Volume	V	m^{3}	✓		Pressure P	
Specific volume	ν	m^{3}/kg		✓		

== See also ==
- Conjugate variables
- Dimensionless numbers
- Intensive and extensive properties
- Thermodynamic databases for pure substances
- Thermodynamic variable
