= Cryoscopic constant =

Material property relating molality to freezing point depression

In thermodynamics, the cryoscopic constant, K_{f}, relates the molality of a solution to its freezing point depression (which is a colligative property).

It is the ratio of the latter to the former:

$$\Delta T_\mathrm{f} = iK_\mathrm{f} b$$

- $\Delta T_\mathrm{f}$ is the depression of freezing point, calculated as the freezing point $T_\mathrm{f}^0$ of the pure solvent minus the freezing point $T_\mathrm{f}$ of the solution;
- i is the van ‘t Hoff factor, representing the number of particles the solute dissociates into or forms when dissolved;
- b is the molality of the solution (moles of solute per kilogram of solvent).

Through cryoscopy, a known constant can be used to calculate an unknown molar mass. The term "cryoscopy" means "freezing measurement" in Greek. Freezing point depression is a colligative property, so ΔT depends only on the number of solute particles dissolved, not on the nature of those particles. Cryoscopy is related to, and is the opposite of ebullioscopy, which determines the same value from the ebullioscopic constant (of boiling point elevation).

The value of K_{f}, which depends on the nature of the solvent, can be calculated by the following equation:

$$K_\text{f} = \frac{MRT_\text{f}^2}{\Delta H_\text{fusion}} = \frac{MRT_\text{f}}{\Delta S_\text{fusion}}$$

- R is the ideal gas constant, 8.314 J mol^{−1} K^{−1}.
- M is the molar mass of the solvent in kg/mol.
- T_{f} is the freezing point of the pure solvent in kelvin.
- ΔH_{fusion} is the molar enthalpy of fusion of the solvent in J/mol.
- ΔS_{fusion} is the molar entropy of fusion of the solvent in J/mol·K.

The K_{f} for water is 1.853 K kg mol^{−1}.

== See also ==
- List of boiling and freezing information of solvents
