= Ernst Otto Beckmann =

German pharmacist and chemist (1853–1923)

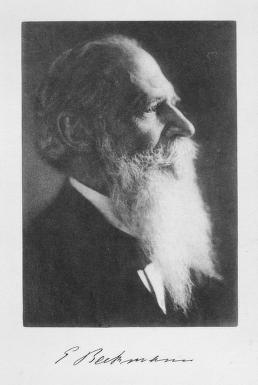
- Beckmann in 1918
- Born: July 4, 1853; Solingen, Germany
- Died: July 12, 1923 (aged 70); Dahlem, Germany
- Known for: Beckmann rearrangement Beckmann thermometer
- Scientific career
- Doctoral advisor: Hermann Kolbe

Ernst Otto Beckmann (July 4, 1853 – July 12, 1923) was a German pharmacist and chemist who is remembered for his invention of the Beckmann differential thermometer and for his discovery of the Beckmann rearrangement.

== Scientific work ==
Ernst Otto Beckmann was born in Solingen, Germany on July 4, 1853, to a family headed by Johannes Friedrich Wilhelm Beckmann, a manufacturer. The elder Beckmann's factory produced mineral dyes, pigments, abrasives, and polishing material, and it was there that the younger Beckmann conducted his early chemical experiments. At the age of 17, Beckmann was persuaded by his father to study pharmacy instead of chemistry, and so in 1870 an apprenticeship was arranged in Elberfeld. However, Beckmann did not enjoy the working conditions and returned home, much to his father's disappointment. After being informed that a career in chemistry would be challenging if he couldn't handle a pharmaceutical apprenticeship, Beckmann went back to Elberfeld to complete his work.. He also worked at pharmacies in Arolsen, Burg an der Wupper, Leipzig, and Cologne.

To improve his theoretical skills, in 1874 Beckmann joined the school of Remigius Fresenius in Wiesbaden, and moved to the University of Leipzig the following year when Fresenius became a professor there. At Leipzig, Beckmann came into contact with the renowned chemist Hermann Kolbe. Although Beckmann wanted to study chemistry, he finished his studies with Fresenius, passing his pharmacy examination in 1877. He then joined Kolbe, and his assistant, Ernst von Meyer, and started work on the oxidation of dialkyle sulfides. In July 1878, Beckmann was awarded his PhD for this research.

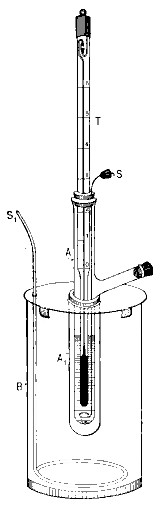
Beckmann freezing-point apparatus and Beckmann thermometer

After a year of voluntary military service, as a pharmacist, Beckmann began studying toxicology at the TU Braunschweig with Robert Otto, receiving his habilitation in 1882. He returned to Leipzig and wanted to work as a lecturer with Kolbe, However, a "technical university's" habilitation was insufficient to qualify for this position. For a habilitation at a university, an abitur from a humanistic gymnasium was necessary, and for this Latin language skills were obligatory. Therefore, Beckmann again began studying, and was able to complete the necessary exams in Latin, Greek language, and history in 1883, and again work at Leipzig. Kolbe died in 1884 and was succeeded by one of his critics, Johannes Wislicenus. This might have threatened Beckmann's academic career, but contrary to expectations, the two chemists became colleagues and friends.

Beckmann tried to apply an already-known reaction to discriminate between aldehydes and ketones. The reaction involved the use of hydroxylamine to convert benzophenone into an oxime. Treating this oxime with phosphorus pentachloride converted it into a substance already characterized by Wallach. This reaction is now known as the Beckmann rearrangement.

In 1887 Wilhelm Ostwald moved to Leipzig, and physical chemistry then became a focus of Beckmann's work, while he served as an assistant to Ostwald. Beckmann used the methods of ebullioscopy (boiling-point elevation) and cryoscopy (freezing-point depression) to determine the molecular masses of several substances. These measurements required a careful determination of temperature differences, as opposed to absolute values, and to accomplish them Beckmann invented the differential thermometer that now carries his name (Beckmann thermometer). For this work, he altered the methods of François-Marie Raoult, and the improvement was sufficiently great that Beckmann's method, and the associated equipment, became standard in chemical laboratories. However, by the end of the twentieth century, these colligative-property techniques had been largely superseded by molecular mass determinations using electronic instrumentation such as mass spectrometers.

It was also during this time of work with Ostwald at Leipzig that Beckmann discovered that sodium and benzophenone react in dry ether to produce a blue solution, now known to be due to ketyl-radical formation. This reactions remains a standard one among chemists seeking to judge the anhydrous state of solvents.

Beckmann left Leipzig to spend a year working at the University of Gießen and then served as a professor at the University of Erlangen, but in 1897 he was back in Leipzig for the third time, as Director of the Laboratory of Applied Chemistry. In 1912 he was asked to head a division of the newly founded Kaiser Wilhelm Institute for Chemistry. He accepted the offer, and moved to Berlin on April 1, 1912, where he remained until his retirement from the institute in October 1921. Afterwards he was allowed to use a laboratory at the institute, and he worked again on the Beckmann rearrangement and measurements of physical properties of solutions.

== Personal life ==
Beckmann married Bertha Oertel on March 20, 1887, and had one daughter and two sons with her.

During the First World War, Beckmann had conducted research on lupin beans to make them available to feed animals. It was his practice to taste water removed from lupins as a way to determine if toxic, bitter portions had been removed by aqueous extractions. It is speculated that this practice might have severely damaged his health, for by his retirement he was quite ill.

Beckmann died in Berlin on July 12, 1923, and was buried at Dahlem.

== See also ==
- Mass spectrometry
- Beckmann thermometer (from the German Wikipedia)
