= Bromley equation =

Calculation involving electrolyte solutions

The Bromley equation was developed in 1973 by Leroy A. Bromley with the objective of calculating activity coefficients for aqueous electrolyte solutions whose concentrations are above the range of validity of the Debye–Hückel equation. This equation, together with Specific ion interaction theory (SIT) and Pitzer equations is important for the understanding of the behaviour of ions dissolved in natural waters such as rivers, lakes and sea-water.

== Description ==
Guggenheim had proposed an extension of the Debye-Hückel equation which is the basis of SIT theory. The equation can be written, in its simplest form for a 1:1 electrolyte, MX, as

$$\log \gamma_{\pm} = \frac{-A_\gamma I^{1/2}}{1+I^{1/2} }+\beta b.$$

$\gamma_{\pm}$ is the mean molal activity coefficient. The first term on the right-hand side is the Debye–Hückel term, with a constant, A, and the ionic strength I. β is an interaction coefficient and b the molality of the electrolyte. As the concentration decreases so the second term becomes less important until, at very low concentrations, the Debye-Hückel equation gives a satisfactory account of the activity coefficient.

Leroy A. Bromley observed that experimental values of $\frac {1}{z_+ z_-}\log \gamma_{\pm}$ were often approximately proportional to ionic strength. Accordingly, he developed the equation, for a salt of general formula $M^{z_+}_p X^{z_-}_q$

$$\log \gamma_{\pm}= \frac{-A_\gamma|z_+z_-|I^{1/2}}{1 + \rho I^{1/2}}+\frac{(0.06+0.6B|z_+z_-|)I}{\left( 1+\frac{1.5}{|z_+z_-|}I \right)^2} +BI$$

At 25 °C A_{γ} is equal to 0.511 and ρ is equal to one. Bromley tabulated values of the interaction coefficient B. He noted that the equation gave satisfactory agreement with experimental data up to ionic strength of 6 molal, though with decreasing precision when extrapolating to very high ionic strength. As with other equations, it is not satisfactory when there is ion association as, for example, with divalent metal sulfates. Bromley also found that B could be expressed in terms of single-ion quantities as

$$B = B_+ + B_- + \delta_+ \delta_-$$

where the + subscript refers to a cation and the minus subscript refers to an anion. Bromley's equation can easily be transformed for the calculation of osmotic coefficients, and Bromley also proposed extensions to multicomponent solutions and for the effect of temperature change.

A modified version of the Bromley equation was developed and used extensively by Madariaga and co-workers. In a comparison of Bromley, SIT and Pitzer models, little difference was found in the quality of fit. The Bromley equation is essentially an empirical equation. The B parameters are relatively easy to determine. However, SIT theory, as extended by Scatchard. and Ciavatta is much more widely used.

By contrast the Pitzer equation is based on rigorous thermodynamics. The determination Pitzer parameters is more laborious. Whilst the Bromley and SIT approaches are based on pair-wise interactions between oppositely charged ions, the Pitzer approach also allows for interactions between three ions. These equations are important for the understanding of the behaviour of ions in natural waters such as rivers, lakes and sea-water.

For some complex electrolytes, Ge et al. obtained the new set of Bromley parameters using up-to-date measured or critically reviewed osmotic coefficient or activity coefficient data.

== See also ==
- Davies equation
- Van 't Hoff factor
