= Dumas method of molecular weight determination =

Physico-chemical characterization method based on the ideal gas equation

The Dumas method of molecular weight determination was historically a procedure used to determine the molecular weight of an unknown volatile substance.

The method was designed by the French chemist Jean Baptiste André Dumas, after whom the procedure is now named. Dumas used the method to determine the vapour densities of elements (mercury, phosphorus, sulfur) and inorganic compounds.

Today, modern methods such as mass spectrometry and elemental analysis are used to determine the molecular weight of a substance.

== Determination ==
The procedure entailed placing a small quantity of the unknown substance into a tared vessel of known volume. The vessel is then heated to a known temperature, such as in a boiling water bath, causing the entire sample to vaporize and completely displace the air from the vessel. The vessel is then sealed, such as with a flame to melt the neck of a glass flask, dried, and re-weighed. By subtracting the tare of the vessel, the actual mass of the unknown vapor within the vessel can be calculated.

Assuming the unknown compound behaves as an ideal gas, the number of moles of the unknown compound, n, can be determined by using the ideal gas law,

$$pV=nRT\,$$

where the pressure, p, is the atmospheric pressure, V is the measured volume of the vessel, T is the absolute temperature of the hot bath, and R is the gas constant.

The molecular weight of the chemical is then simply the mass in grams of the vapor within the vessel divided by the calculated number of mole.

== Assumptions ==
Two major assumptions are used in this method:

1. The compound vapor behaves as an ideal gas (follows all 5 postulates of the kinetic theory of gases)
2. Either the volume of the vessel does not vary significantly between room temperature and the working temperature, or the volume of the vessel may be accurately determined at the working temperature

== See also ==
- Victor Meyer apparatus
- Cryoscopy and ebullioscopy, two other methods for the determination of molecular weights
