= Boiling-point elevation =

Physical phenomenon

Boiling-point elevation is the phenomenon whereby the boiling point of a liquid (a solvent) will be higher when another compound is added, meaning that a solution has a higher boiling point than a pure solvent. This happens whenever a non-volatile solute, such as a salt, is added to a pure solvent, such as water. The boiling point can be measured accurately using an ebullioscope.

== Explanation ==
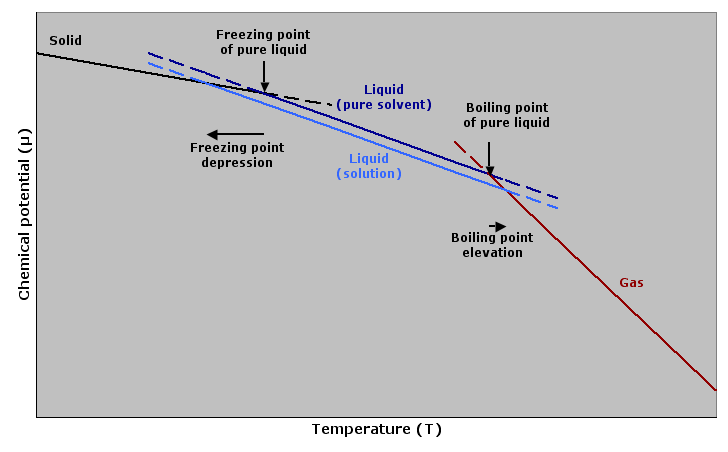
The change in chemical potential of a solvent when a solute is added explains why boiling point elevation takes place.

The boiling point elevation is a colligative property, which means that boiling point elevation is dependent on the number of dissolved particles but not their identity. It is an effect of the dilution of the solvent in the presence of a solute. It is a phenomenon that happens for all solutes in all solutions, even in ideal solutions, and does not depend on any specific solute–solvent interactions. The boiling point elevation happens both when the solute is an electrolyte, such as various salts, or a nonelectrolyte. In thermodynamic terms, the origin of the boiling point elevation is entropic and can be explained in terms of the vapor pressure or chemical potential of the solvent. In both cases, the explanation depends on the fact that many solutes are only present in the liquid phase and do not enter into the gas phase (except at extremely high temperatures).

The vapor pressure affects the solute shown by Raoult's Law while the free energy change and chemical potential are shown by Gibbs free energy. Most solutes remain in the liquid phase and do not enter the gas phase, except at very high temperatures.

In terms of vapor pressure, a liquid boils when its vapor pressure equals the surrounding pressure. A nonvolatile solute lowers the solvent's vapor pressure, meaning a higher temperature is needed for the vapor pressure to equalize the surrounding pressure, causing the boiling point to elevate.

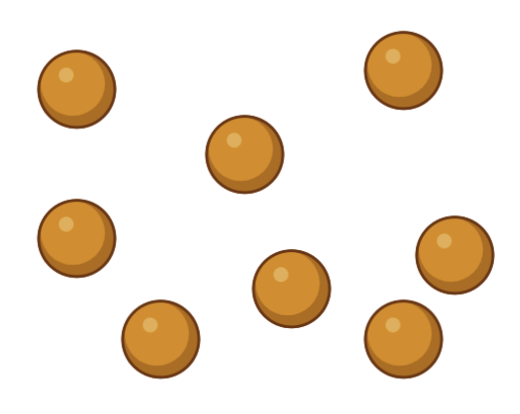
Original vapor pressure

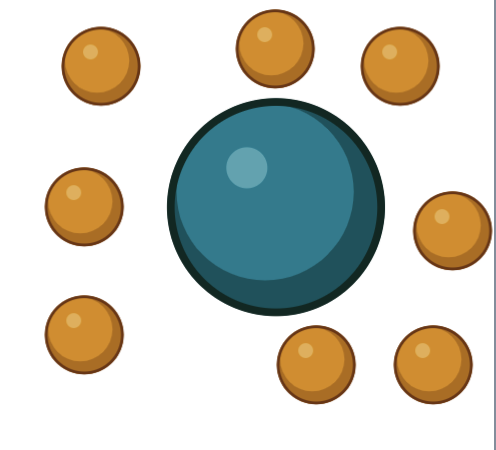
A nonvolatile solute lowers the solvent's vapor pressure

In terms of chemical potential, at the boiling point, the liquid and gas phases have the same chemical potential. Adding a nonvolatile solute lowers the solvent's chemical potential in the liquid phase, but the gas phase remains unaffected. This shifts the equilibrium between phases to a higher temperature, elevating the boiling point.

== Relationship to freezing-point depression ==
Freezing-point depression is analogous to boiling point elevation, though the magnitude of freezing-point depression is higher for the same solvent and solute concentration. These phenomena extend the liquid range of a solvent in the presence of a solute.

== Related equations for calculating boiling point ==
The extent of boiling-point elevation can be calculated by applying Clausius–Clapeyron relation and Raoult's law together with the assumption of the non-volatility of the solute. The result is that in dilute ideal solutions, the extent of boiling-point elevation is directly proportional to the molal concentration (amount of substance per mass) of the solution according to the equation:

ΔT_{b} = K_{b} · b_{c}

where the boiling point elevation, is defined as T_{b (solution)} − T_{b (pure solvent)}.

- K_{b}, the ebullioscopic constant, which is dependent on the properties of the solvent. It can be calculated as K_{b} = RT_{b}^{2}M/ΔH_{v}, where R is the gas constant, and T_{b} is the boiling temperature of the pure solvent [in K], M is the molar mass of the solvent, and ΔH_{v} is the heat of vaporization per mole of the solvent.
- b_{c} is the colligative molality, calculated by taking dissociation into account since the boiling point elevation is a colligative property, dependent on the number of particles in solution. This is most easily done by using the van 't Hoff factor i as b_{c} = b_{solute} · i, where b_{solute} is the molality of the solute. The factor i accounts for the number of individual particles (typically ions) formed by a compound in solution. Examples:
  - i = 1 for sugar in water
  - i = 1.9 for sodium chloride in water, due to the near full dissociation of NaCl into Na^{+} and Cl^{−} (often simplified as 2)
  - i = 2.3 for calcium chloride in water, due to nearly full dissociation of CaCl_{2} into Ca^{2+} and 2Cl^{−} (often simplified as 3)

Non integer i factors result from ion pairs in solution, which lower the effective number of particles in the solution.

Equation after including the van 't Hoff factor:

ΔT_{b} = K_{b} · b_{solute} · i

The above formula reduces precision at high concentrations, due to nonideality of the solution. If the solute is volatile, one of the key assumptions used in deriving the formula is not true because the equation derived is for solutions of non-volatile solutes in a volatile solvent. In the case of volatile solutes, the equation can represent a mixture of volatile compounds more accurately, and the effect of the solute on the boiling point must be determined from the phase diagram of the mixture. In such cases, the mixture can sometimes have a lower boiling point than either of the pure components; a mixture with a minimum boiling point is a type of azeotrope.

=== Ebullioscopic constants ===
Values of the ebullioscopic constants (K_{b}) for selected solvents:

Compound	Boiling point in °C	Ebullioscopic constant K_{b} in units of [(°C·kg)/mol] or [°C/molal]
Acetic acid	118.1	3.07
Benzene	80.1	2.53
Carbon disulfide	46.2	2.37
Carbon tetrachloride	76.8	4.95
Naphthalene	217.9	5.8
Phenol	181.75	3.04
Water	100	0.512

== Uses ==
Together with the formula above, the boiling-point elevation can be used to measure the degree of dissociation or the molar mass of the solute. This kind of measurement is called ebullioscopy (Latin-Greek, "boiling-viewing"). However, superheating is a factor that can affect the precision of the measurement and would be challenging to avoid because of the decrease in molecular mobility. Therefore, ΔT_{b} would be hard to measure precisely even though superheating can be partially overcome by the invention of the Beckmann thermometer. In reality, cryoscopy is used more often because the freezing point is often easier to measure with precision.

== See also ==
- Dühring's rule
- List of boiling and freezing information of solvents
- Physical chemistry
