= Specific ion interaction theory =

Method to estimate ion activity coefficients in solution

In theoretical chemistry, Specific ion Interaction Theory (SIT theory) is a theory used to estimate single-ion activity coefficients in electrolyte solutions at relatively high concentrations. It does so by taking into consideration interaction coefficients between the various ions present in solution. Interaction coefficients are determined from equilibrium constant values obtained with solutions at various ionic strengths. The determination of SIT interaction coefficients also yields the value of the equilibrium constant at infinite dilution.

== Background ==
This theory arises from the need to derive activity coefficients of solutes when their concentrations are too high to be predicted accurately by the Debye–Hückel theory. Activity coefficients are needed because an equilibrium constant is defined in chemical thermodynamics as the ratio of activities but is usually measured using concentrations. The protonation of a monobasic acid will be used to simplify the presentation. The equilibrium for protonation of the conjugate base, A^{−} of the acid HA, may be written as:

$$\ce{H+ + A- <=> HA}$$

for which the association constant K is defined as:

$$K=\frac\ce{\{HA\}}\ce{\{H^+\}\{A^{-}\}}$$

where {HA}, {H^{+}}, and {A^{–}} represent the activity of the corresponding chemical species. The role of water in the association equilibrium is ignored, as in all but the most concentrated solutions the activity of water is constant. K is defined here as an association constant, the reciprocal of an acid dissociation constant.

Each activity term { } can be expressed as the product of a concentration [ ] and an activity coefficient γ. For example,

$$\{HA\} = [HA]\times   \gamma_{HA}$$

where the square brackets represent a concentration and γ is an activity coefficient. Thus the equilibrium constant can be expressed as a product of a concentration ratio and an activity coefficient ratio.

$$K=\frac\ce{[HA]}\ce{[H^+][A^{-}]}\times \frac{\gamma_\ce{HA}}{\gamma_\ce{H^+}\gamma_\ce{A^-}}$$

Taking the logarithms:

$$\log K =\log K^0 + \log \gamma_\ce{HA} - \log \gamma_\ce{H^+} - \log \gamma_\ce{A^{-}}$$

where:

$K^0=\frac\ce{[HA]}\ce{[H^+][A^{-}]}$ at infinite dilution of the solution

K^{0} is the hypothetical value that the equilibrium constant K would have if the solution of the acid HA was infinitely diluted and that the activity coefficients of all the species in solution were equal to one.

It is a common practice to determine equilibrium constants in solutions containing an electrolyte at high ionic strength such that the activity coefficients are effectively constant. However, when the ionic strength is changed, the measured equilibrium constant will also change, so there is a need to estimate individual (single-ion) activity coefficients. Debye–Hückel theory provides a means to do this, but it is accurate only at very low concentrations. Hence the need for an extension to Debye–Hückel theory. Two main approaches have been used. SIT theory, discussed here and Pitzer equations.

== Development ==
SIT theory was first proposed by Brønsted in 1922 and was further developed by Guggenheim in 1955. Scatchard extended the theory in 1936 to allow the interaction coefficients to vary with ionic strength. The theory was mainly of theoretical interest until 1945 because of the difficulty of determining equilibrium constants before the glass electrode was invented. Subsequently, Ciavatta developed the theory further in 1980.

The activity coefficient of the j^{th} ion in solution is written as γ_{j} when concentrations are on the molal concentration scale (mol/kg) and as y_{j} when concentrations are on the molar concentration scale (mol/L) (the molality scale is preferred in thermodynamics because molal concentrations are independent of temperature and the related solution volume changes). The basic idea of SIT theory is that the activity coefficient can be expressed as

$\log \gamma_j= -z_j^2 \frac{0.51 \sqrt I}{1+1.5 \sqrt I}+\sum _k \epsilon_{jk} m_k$ (molalities)

or

$\log y_j= -z_j^2 \frac{0.51 \sqrt I}{1+1.5 \sqrt I}+\sum _k b_{jk} c_k$ (molar concentrations)

where z is the electrical charge on the ion, I is the ionic strength, ε and b are interaction coefficients and m and c are concentrations. The summation extends over the other ions present in solution, which includes the ions produced by the background electrolyte. The first term in these expressions comes from Debye–Hückel theory. The second term shows how the contributions from "interaction" are dependent on concentration. Thus, the interaction coefficients are used as corrections to Debye–Hückel theory when concentrations are higher than the region of validity of that theory.

The activity coefficient of a neutral species can be assumed to depend linearly on ionic strength, as in

$$\log \gamma = k_m I\,$$

where k_{m} is a Sechenov coefficient.

In the example of a monobasic acid HA, assuming that the background electrolyte is the salt NaNO_{3}, the interaction coefficients will be for interaction between H^{+} and NO_{3}^{−}, and between A^{−} and Na^{+}.

== Determination and application ==
Firstly, equilibrium constants are determined at a number of different ionic strengths, at a chosen temperature and particular background electrolyte. The interaction coefficients are then determined by fitting to the observed equilibrium constant values. The procedure also provides the value of K at infinite dilution. It is not limited to monobasic acids. and can also be applied to metal complexes. The SIT and Pitzer approaches have been compared recently. The Bromley equation has also been compared to both SIT and Pitzer equations. It has been shown that the SIT equation is a practical simplification of a more complicated hypothesis, that is rigorously applicable only at trace concentrations of reactant and product species immersed in a surrounding electrolyte medium.
