= Ebullioscopic constant =

Chemical and physical constant of materials

In thermodynamics, the ebullioscopic constant K_{b} relates molality b to boiling point elevation. It is the ratio of the latter to the former:

$$\Delta T_\text{b} = iK_\text{b} b$$

- i is the van 't Hoff factor, the number of particles the solute splits into or forms when dissolved.
- b is the molality of the solution.

A formula to compute the ebullioscopic constant is:

$$K_\text{b} = \frac{MRT_\text{b}^2}{\Delta H_\text{vap}} = \frac{MRT_\text{b}}{\Delta S_\text{vap}}$$

- R is the ideal gas constant.
- M is the molar mass of the solvent in kg/mol.
- T_{b} is boiling point of the pure solvent in kelvin.
- ΔH_{vap} is the molar enthalpy of vaporization of the solvent in J/mol.
- ΔS_{vap} is the molar entropy of vaporization of the solvent in J/mol·K.

Through the procedure called ebullioscopy, a known constant can be used to calculate an unknown molar mass. The term ebullioscopy means "boiling measurement" in Latin. This is related to cryoscopy, which determines the same value from the cryoscopic constant (of freezing point depression).

This property of elevation of boiling point is a colligative property. It means that the property, in this case ΔT, depends on the number of particles dissolved into the solvent and not the nature of those particles.

== Values for some solvents ==
Solvent	K_{b} (in K⋅kg/mol)
Acetic acid	3.08
Benzene	2.53
Camphor	5.95
Carbon disulfide	2.34
Carbon tetrachloride	5.03
Chloroform	3.63
Cyclohexane	2.79
Diethyl ether	2.02
Ethanol	1.07
Water	0.512

== See also ==
- Ebullioscope
- List of boiling and freezing information of solvents
- Boiling-point elevation
- Colligative properties
