= List of boiling and freezing information of solvents =

Solvent	Density (g cm-3)	Boiling point (°C)	Flash point (°C)	K_{b} (°C⋅kg/mol)	Freezing point (°C)	K_{f} (°C⋅kg/mol)	Data source
Aniline	1.0297	184.3		3.69	–5.96	–5.87	K_{b} & K_{f}
Lauric acid		298.9		44	–3.9		
2-Methyltetrahydrofuran	0.854	80.2		−136			
Acetic acid	1.04	117.9		3.14	16.6	–3.90	K_{b} K_{f}
Acetone	0.78	56.2		1.67	–94.8		K_{b}
Benzene	0.87	80.1		2.65	5.5	–5.12	K_{b} & K_{f}
Bromobenzene	1.49	156.0		6.26	–30.6		
Camphor	0.992	204.0		5.95	179	–40	K_{f}
Carbon disulfide	1.29	46.2		2.34	–111.5	–3.83	
Carbon tetrachloride	1.58	76.8		4.88	–22.8	–29.8	K_{b} & K_{f}
Chloroform	1.48	61.2		3.88	–63.5	–4.90	K_{b} & K_{f}
Cyclohexane		80.74		2.79	6.55	–20.2	
Diethyl ether	0.713	34.5		2.16	–116.3	–1.79	K_{b} & K_{f}
Methanol	0.79	64.7					
Ethanol	0.78	78.4		1.22	–114.6	–1.99	K_{b}
Ethylene bromide	2.18	133		6.43	9.974	–12.5	K_{b} & K_{f}
Ethylene glycol	1.11	197.3		2.26	−12.9	–3.11	K_{b} & K_{f}
Formic acid		101.0		2.4	8.0	–2.77	K_{b} & K_{f}
Naphthalene		217.9			78.2	–6.80	
Nitrobenzene		210.8		5.24	5.7	–7.00	
Phenol		181.75		3.60	43.0	–7.27	K_{f} K_{b}
Water		100.00		0.512	0.00	–1.86	K_{b} & K_{f}
Ethyl acetate		77.1					
Acetic anhydride		139.0					
Ethylene dichloride	1.25	83.5			−35		
Acetonitrile	0.78	81.6			−45		
Heptane		98.4					
Isobutanol		107.7					
n-Hexane	0.66	68.7					
n-Butanol	0.81	117.7					
Hydrochloric acid (Hydrogen chloride)	(gas at room temperature)	-85			−114		
tert-Butanol		82.5					
Chlorobenzene		131.7					
PCBTF	1.34	136			–36.1		
MTBE		55.2					
Pentane		36.1					
Petroleum ether		35.0–60.0					
Cyclopentane		49.3					
Isopropanol		82.3					
Dichloromethane	1.33	39.8					
n-Propanol		97.2					
Pyridine		115.3					
Dimethylacetamide		166.1					
Tetrahydrofuran		66.0					
Dimethylformamide		153.0					
Toluene	0.82	110.6					
Dimethyl sulfoxide		189.0					
Trifluoroacetic acid		71.8					
Dioxane	1.03	101.0			11.8		
Xylene		140.0					

== See also ==
- Freezing-point depression
- Boiling-point elevation
- List of cooling baths
