= Mass photometry =

Mass photometry is a biophysical characterization method that determines the molecular mass of molecules such as proteins, lipids, sugars and nucleic acids, as well as macromolecular complexes. Mass photometry determines the mass of individual particles in solution by quantifying their light scattering.

== Working principle ==
The technique uses a microscope to measure interference-scattered light of each particle. A solution of biomolecules is placed on a glass slide, where each molecule interacts with the glass surface. This interaction produces a small, but measurable light scattering signal, which correlates linearly with that particle's mass. Mass photometry can measure each individual mass of a mixture of particles, therefore it is useful to determine homogeneity of a sample or the formation of macromolecular complexes. Mass photometry can analyze particles over a wide range of molecular masses (40 kDa to 5 MDa) and requires no labelling or pre-treatment of the sample. This makes it especially useful for determining biochemical interactions under physiological conditions, such as aqueous buffers and low sample concentrations. A single sample takes less than 10 minutes to measure. The accuracy of mass photometry is around 2% error, with a resolution of up to 20 kDa. This limitation makes quantification challenging for lighter particles below the <50 kDa range.

== Specific applications ==
Mass photometry has been used to detect the following biomolecules and biological processes:

- Dynamic and specificity of DNA-protein interactions
- Measuring single molecules of DNA
- Stability of protein samples over time
- Determining length and stability of RNA
- Characterizing nano-structures made of polysarcosine, lipid vesicles and lipid micelles for drug delivery
- Study of protein-protein interactions such as the ACE2 receptor and protein oligomerization in amyloids

== History ==
Mass photometry was first published in 2018, and further refined over the early 2020ies to increase contrast and accuracy. Due to these advances, the method now also allows determination of sample heterogeneity, interaction energies, and reaction kinetics. Due to its novelty and limited accuracy, mass photometry is sometimes combined with complementary analysis methods, such as mass spectrometry, FRET, and analytical ultracentrifugation.
