= Jean-Baptiste Dumas =

French chemist (1800–1884)

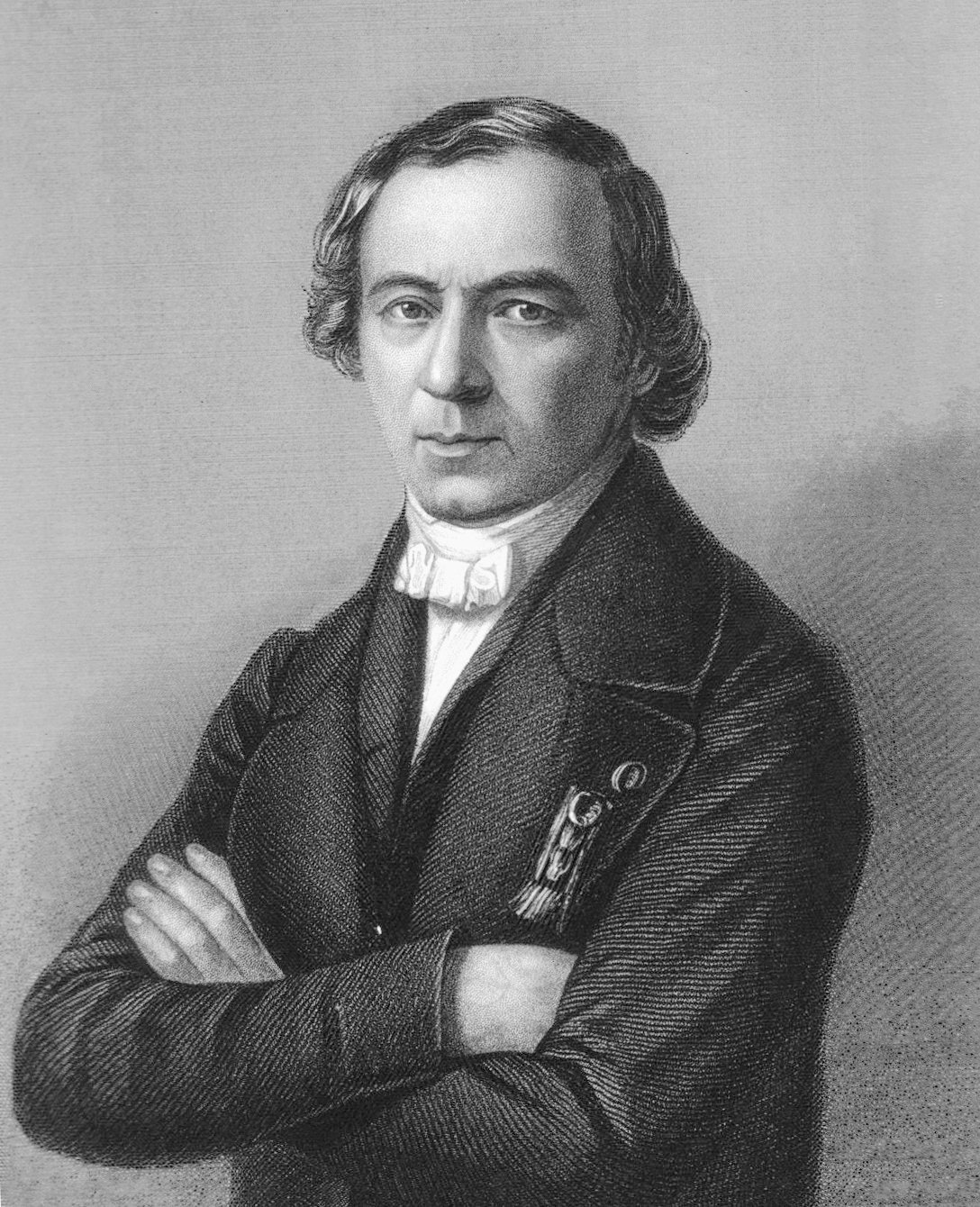
- Born: 14 July 1800; Alès, France
- Died: 10 April 1884 (aged 83); Cannes, France
- Known for: Atomic weights
- Awards: Copley Medal (1843); Faraday Lectureship Prize (1869); Albert Medal (1877)
- Scientific career
- Fields: Chemistry
- Theses: Dissertation sur la densité de la vapeur de quelques corps simples (1832); Mémoire sur les substances végétales qui se rapprochent du camphre et sur quelques huiles essentielles (1832)
- Notable students: Eugène-Anatole Demarçay, Auguste Laurent

Jean Baptiste André Dumas (French pronunciation: [ʒɑ̃ batist ɑ̃dʁe dyma]; 14 July 1800 – 10 April 1884) was a French chemist, best known for his works on organic analysis and synthesis, as well as the determination of atomic weights (relative atomic masses) and molecular weights by measuring vapor densities. He also developed a method for the analysis of nitrogen in compounds.

== Biography ==
Dumas was born in Alès (Gard), and became an apprentice to an apothecary in his native town. In 1816, he moved to Geneva, where he attended lectures by M. A. Pictet in physics, C. G. de la Rive in chemistry, and A. P. de Candolle in botany, and before he had reached his majority, he was engaged with Pierre Prévost in original work on problems of physiological chemistry and embryology. In 1822, he moved to Paris, acting on the advice of Alexander von Humboldt, where he became professor of chemistry, initially at the Lyceum, later (1835) at the École polytechnique. He was one of the founders of the École centrale des arts et manufactures (later named École centrale Paris) in 1829.

In 1832 Dumas became a member of the French Academy of Sciences. From 1868 until his death in 1884 he would serve the academy as the permanent secretary for its department of Physical Sciences. In 1838, Dumas was elected a foreign member of the Royal Swedish Academy of Sciences. The same year he became correspondent of the Royal Institute of the Netherlands and, when that became the Royal Netherlands Academy of Arts and Sciences in 1851, he joined as a foreign member. Dumas was president of Société d'encouragement pour l'industrie nationale from 1845 to 1864. He was elected to the American Philosophical Society in 1860.

After 1848, he exchanged much of his scientific work for ministerial posts under Napoléon III. He became a member of the National Legislative Assembly. He acted as minister of agriculture and commerce for a few months in 1850–1851, and subsequently became a senator, president of the municipal council of Paris, and master of the French mint, but his official career came to a sudden end with the fall of the Second Empire.

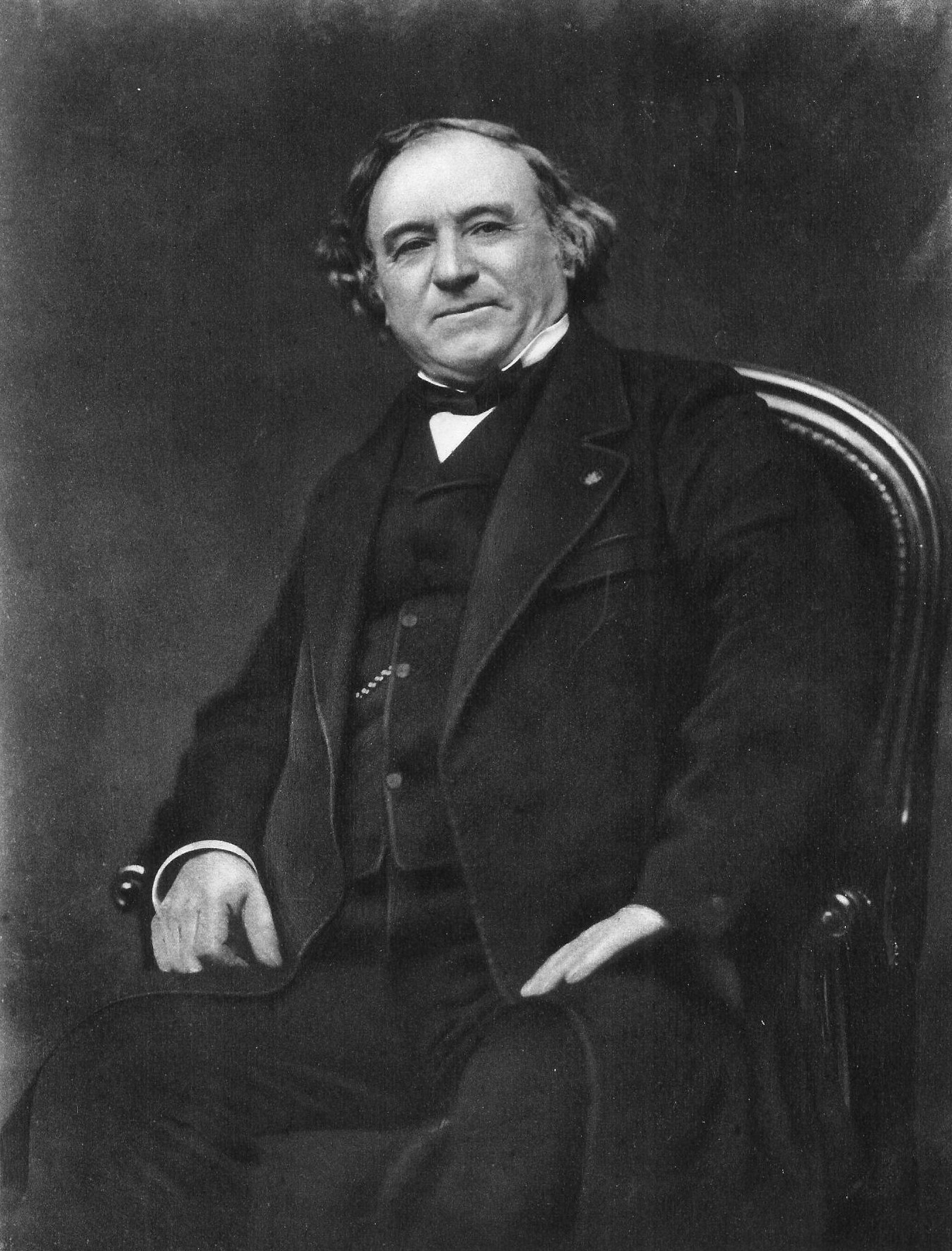
Jean-Baptiste Dumas

Dumas was a devout Catholic who would often defend Christian views against critics.

Dumas died at Cannes in 1884, and is buried at the Montparnasse Cemetery in Paris, in a large tomb near the back wall.

== Scientific work ==
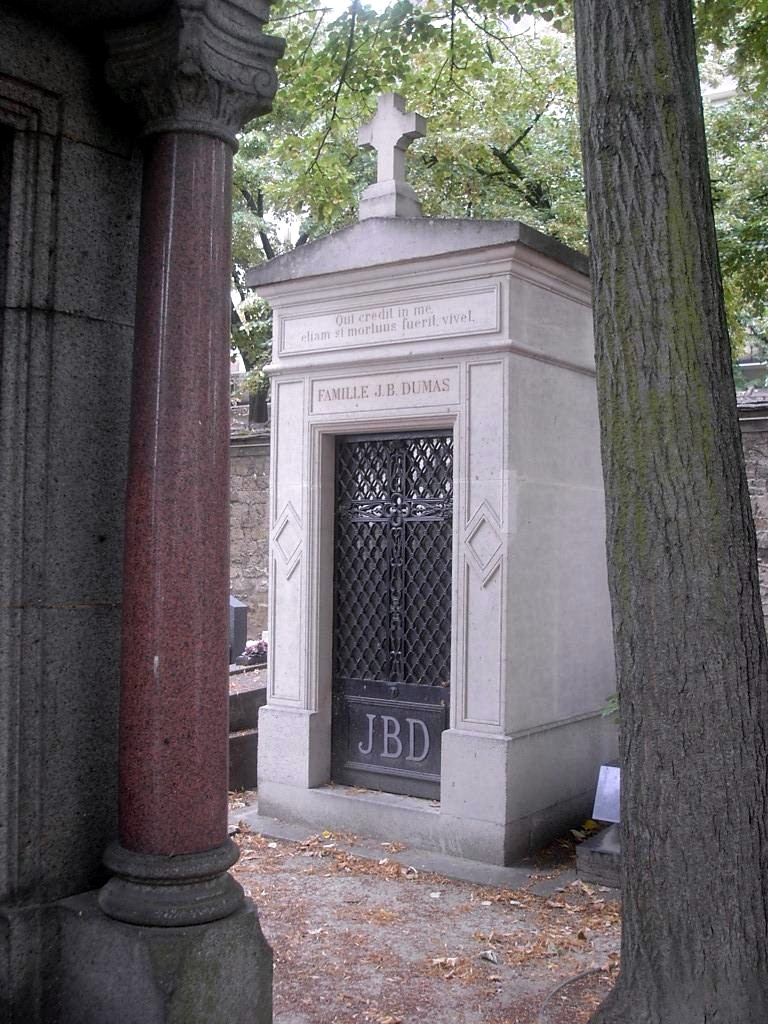
Grave of Dumas (Paris)

Dumas was one of the first to criticise the electro-chemical doctrines of Jöns Jakob Berzelius, which, at the time his work began, were widely accepted as the true theory of the constitution of compound bodies, and opposed a unitary view to the dualistic conception of the Swedish chemist. In a paper on the atomic theory, published in 1826, he anticipated to a remarkable extent some ideas which are frequently supposed to belong to a later period; and the continuation of these studies led him to the ideas about substitution (metalepsis) which were developed about 1839 into the theory (Older Style Theory) that in organic chemistry there are certain types which remain unchanged even when their hydrogen is replaced by an equivalent quantity of a halide element. The classification of organic compounds into homologous series was advanced as one consequence of his researches into the acids generated by the oxidation of the alcohols.

Dumas also showed that kidneys remove urea from the blood.

=== Vapour densities and atomic masses ===
Dumas perfected the method of measuring vapor densities which was also important in determining atomic weights (see below). A known amount of the substance being analyzed was put into a previously weighed glass bulb, which was then sealed and heated in water to vaporize the substance. The pressure was recorded with a barometer, and the bulb is allowed to cool to determine the mass of the vapor. The universal gas law was then used to determine the moles of gas within the bulb.

In an 1826 paper, he described his method for ascertaining vapour densities, and the redeterminations which he undertook by its aid of the atomic weights of carbon and oxygen proved the forerunners of a long series which included some thirty of the elements, the results being mostly published in 1858–1860. He showed "in all elastic fluids observed under the same conditions, the molecules are placed at equal distances". He also determined the atomic weight of samarium, one of the rare earth elements.

Dumas established new values for the atomic mass of thirty elements, setting the value for hydrogen to 1.

=== Determination of nitrogen ===
In 1833, Dumas developed a method for estimating the amount of nitrogen in an organic compound, founding modern analysis methods. He made important revisions to the existing combustion methods with a sophisticated pneumatic trough. These revisions were the flushing of the combustion tube with carbon dioxide and the addition of potassium hydroxide in the pneumatic trough. Flushing with carbon dioxide eliminated the nitrogen present in the air that previously occupied the combustion tube, eliminating the need for correction due to nitrogen in the air. The potassium hydroxide dissolved the passing carbon dioxide gas, which left nitrogen as the only gas in the collection tube.

=== Theory of substitution and theory of chemical types ===
At the Tuileries palace in Paris, guests at a soirée began reacting adversely to a gas suddenly emitted by the candles. Alexandre Brongniart asked his son-in-law, Dumas, to investigate. Dumas found that the coughing and dangerous fumes were caused by chlorine present in the candle wax. Chlorine had been used to whiten the candles, and Dumas concluded that it must have combined during the candle-making process. This led Dumas to investigate the behavior of chlorine substitution in other chemical compounds.

One of the most important research projects of Dumas was that on the action of chlorine on acetic acid to form trichloroacetic acid – a derivative of essentially the same character as the acetic acid itself, though a stronger acid. Dumas extended this to a theory (sometimes considered a law) which states that in an organic compound, a hydrogen atom may be substituted for any halogen.

In his published paper on the subject, Dumas introduces his theory of types. Since the trichloracetic acid retained similar properties to acetic acid, Dumas reasoned that there were certain chemical structures that remained comparatively unchanged even if one atom were changed within them. The basis of this theory rests in the natural history of organism classification, which Dumas learned under the botanist de Candolle. This new theory challenged Berzelius's previous theory of electrochemical dualism and was also a competitor of radical theory.

== Family ==
He married Herminie Brongniart, daughter of Alexandre Brongniart, in 1826.

== Honours ==
Dumas is one of the 72 names inscribed on the Eiffel tower.

== See also ==
- Dumas method
- Dumas method of molecular weight determination
