= Ebullioscope =

Instrument for measuring a liquid's boiling point

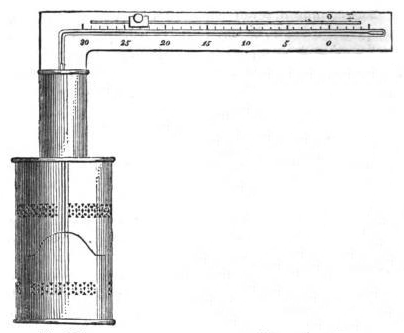
Vidal ebullioscope

In physics, an ebullioscope (from Latin ēbullīre 'to boil') is an instrument for measuring the boiling point of a liquid. This can be used for determining the alcoholic strength of a mixture, or for determining the molecular weight of a non-volatile solute based on the boiling-point elevation. The procedure is known as ebullioscopy.

The first ebullioscope was invented in 1838 by Honoré Brossard-Vidal, and was used for measuring alcoholic content. The advantage of this method was that the boiling point is relatively insensitive to other components such as sugars. Older alcoholimeters were based on measuring the density, which is more sensitive to the presence of other solutes.

A famous ebullioscope variant was built by Pierre Marie Edouard Malligand, patented in 1876. The device is used by winemakers still to this day to measure the alcohol contents of wines, using the "Malligand degree" (M°) as a unit of measure.

A later version was built by the French chemist François-Marie Raoult, but the difficulty of determining the exact temperature was overcome by the invention of the Beckmann thermometer by Ernst Otto Beckmann in 1887. This improvement made the ebullioscope a standard apparatus to determine the molecular weight of substances in solution by using the ebullioscopic constant of the solvent.

== See also ==
- Ebulliometer
