= Raoult's law =

Law of thermodynamics for vapour pressure of a mixture

Raoult's law (/ˈrɑːuːlz/ law) is a relation of physical chemistry, with implications in thermodynamics. Proposed by French chemist François-Marie Raoult in 1887, it states that the partial pressure of each component of an ideal mixture of liquids is equal to the vapor pressure of the pure component (liquid or solid) multiplied by its mole fraction in the mixture. In consequence, the relative lowering of vapor pressure of a dilute solution of nonvolatile solute is equal to the mole fraction of solute in the solution.

Mathematically, Raoult's law for a single component in an ideal solution is stated as

$$p_i = p_i^\star x_i$$

where $p_i$ is the partial pressure of the component $i$ in the gaseous mixture above the solution, $p_i^\star$ is the equilibrium vapor pressure of the pure component $i$, and $x_i$ is the mole fraction of the component $i$ in the liquid or solid solution.

Where two volatile liquids A and B are mixed with each other to form a solution, the vapor phase consists of both components of the solution. Once the components in the solution have reached equilibrium, the total vapor pressure of the solution can be determined by combining Raoult's law with Dalton's law of partial pressures to give

$$p = p_\text{A}^\star x_\text{A} + p_\text{B}^\star x_\text{B} + \cdots.$$

In other words, the vapor pressure of the solution is the mole-weighted mean of the individual vapour pressures:

$$p = \dfrac{p_\text{A}^\star n_\text{A} + p_\text{B}^\star n_\text{B} + \cdots}{n_\text{A} + n_\text{B} + \cdots}$$

If a non-volatile solute B (it has zero vapor pressure, so does not evaporate) is dissolved into a solvent A to form an ideal solution, the vapor pressure of the solution will be lower than that of the solvent. In an ideal solution of a nonvolatile solute, the decrease in vapor pressure is directly proportional to the mole fraction of solute:

$$p = p_\text{A}^\star x_\text{A},$$
$$\Delta p = p_\text{A}^\star - p = p_\text{A}^\star(1 - x_\text{A}) = p_\text{A}^\star x_\text{B}.$$

If the solute associates or dissociates in the solution (such as an electrolyte/salt), the expression of the law includes the van 't Hoff factor as a correction factor. That is, the mole fraction must be calculated using the actual number of particles in solution.

== Principles ==
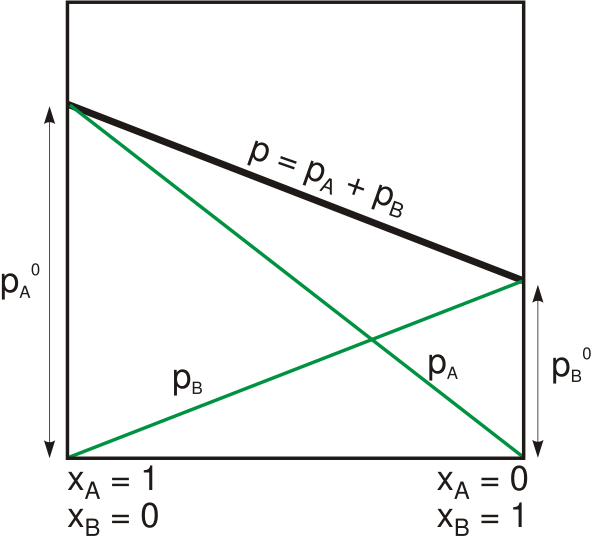
Vapor pressure of a binary solution that obeys Raoult's law. The black line shows the total vapor pressure as a function of the mole fraction of component B, and the two green lines are the partial pressures of the two components.

Raoult's law is a phenomenological relation that assumes ideal behavior based on the simple microscopic assumption that intermolecular forces between unlike molecules are equal to those between similar molecules, and that their molar volumes are the same: the conditions of an ideal solution. This is analogous to the ideal gas law, which is a limiting law valid when the interactive forces between molecules approach zero, for example as the concentration approaches zero. Raoult's law is instead valid if the physical properties of the components are identical. The more similar the components are, the more their behavior approaches that described by Raoult's law. For example, if the two components differ only in isotopic content, then Raoult's law is essentially exact.

Comparing measured vapor pressures to predicted values from Raoult's law provides information about the true relative strength of intermolecular forces. If the vapor pressure is less than predicted (a negative deviation), fewer molecules of each component than expected have left the solution in the presence of the other component, indicating that the forces between unlike molecules are stronger. The converse is true for positive deviations.

For a solution of two liquids A and B, Raoult's law predicts that if no other gases are present, then the total vapor pressure $p$ above the solution is equal to the weighted sum of the "pure" vapor pressures $p_\text{A}$ and $p_\text{B}$ of the two components. Thus the total pressure above the solution of A and B would be

$$p = p_\text{A}^\star x_\text{A} + p_\text{B}^\star x_\text{B}.$$

Since the sum of the mole fractions is equal to one,

$$p = p_\text{A}^\star (1 - x_\text{B}) + p_\text{B}^\star x_\text{B} = p_\text{A}^\star + (p_\text{B}^\star - p_\text{A}^\star) x_\text{B}.$$

This is a linear function of the mole fraction $x_\text{B}$, as shown in the graph.

== Thermodynamic considerations ==
Raoult's law was first observed empirically and led François-Marie Raoult to postulate that the vapor pressure above an ideal mixture of liquids is equal to the sum of the vapor pressures of each component multiplied by its mole fraction. Taking compliance with Raoult's Law as a defining characteristic of ideality in a solution, it is possible to deduce that the chemical potential of each component of the liquid is given by

$$\mu _i  = \mu_i^\star  + RT \ln x_i,$$

where $\mu_i^\star$ is the chemical potential in the pure state and $x_i$ is the mole fraction of component $i$ in the ideal solution. From this equation, other thermodynamic properties of an ideal solution may be determined. If the assumption that the vapor follows the ideal gas law is added, Raoult's law may be derived as follows.

If the system is ideal, then, at equilibrium, the chemical potential of each component $i$ must be the same in the liquid and gas states. That is,

$$\mu_{i, \text{liq}} = \mu_{i, \text{vap}}.$$

Substituting the formula for chemical potential gives

$$\mu_{i, \text{liq}}^\star + RT \ln x_i = \mu_{i, \text{vap}}^\ominus + RT \ln\frac{f_i}{p^\ominus},$$

as the gas-phase mole fraction depends on its fugacity, $f_i$, as a fraction of the pressure in the reference state, $p^\ominus$.

The corresponding equation when the system consists purely of component $i$ in equilibrium with its vapor is

$$\mu_{i, \text{liq}}^\star = \mu_{i, \text{vap}}^\ominus + RT \ln\frac{f_i^\star}{p^\ominus}.$$

Subtracting these equations and re-arranging leads to the result

$$f_i = x_i f_i^\star.$$

For the ideal gas, pressure and fugacity are equal, so introducing simple pressures to this result yields Raoult's law:

$$p_i = x_i p_i^\star.$$

=== Ideal mixing ===
An ideal solution would follow Raoult's law, but most solutions deviate from ideality. Interactions between gas molecules are typically quite small, especially if the vapor pressures are low. However, the interactions in a liquid are very strong. For a solution to be ideal, the interactions between unlike molecules must be of the same magnitude as those between like molecules. This approximation is only true when the different species are almost chemically identical. One can see that from considering the Gibbs free energy change of mixing:

$$\Delta_\text{mix} G = nRT (x_1 \ln x_1 + x_2 \ln x_2).$$

This is always negative, so mixing is spontaneous. However, the expression is, apart from a factor $-T$, equal to the entropy of mixing. This leaves no room at all for an enthalpy effect and implies that $\Delta_\text{mix} H$ must be equal to zero, and this can only be true if the interactions between the molecules are indifferent.

It can be shown using the Gibbs–Duhem equation that if Raoult's law holds over the entire concentration range $x \in [0,\ 1]$ in a binary solution then, for the second component, the same must also hold.

If deviations from the ideal are not too large, Raoult's law is still valid in a narrow concentration range when approaching $x \to 1$ for the majority phase (the solvent). The solute also shows a linear limiting law, but with a different coefficient. This relationship is known as Henry's law.

The presence of these limited linear regimes has been experimentally verified in a great number of cases, though large deviations occur in a variety of cases. Consequently, both its pedagogical value and utility have been questioned at the introductory college level. In a perfectly ideal system, where ideal liquid and ideal vapor are assumed, a very useful equation emerges if Raoult's law is combined with Dalton's Law:

$x_i = \frac{y_i p_\text{total}}{p_i^\star},$

where $x_i$ is the mole fraction of component $i$ in the solution, and $y_i$ is its mole fraction in the gas phase. This equation shows that, for an ideal solution where each pure component has a different vapor pressure, the gas phase is enriched in the component with the higher vapor pressure when pure, and the solution is enriched in the component with the lower pure vapor pressure. This phenomenon is the basis for distillation.

=== Non-ideal mixing ===
In elementary applications, Raoult's law is generally valid when the liquid phase is either nearly pure or a mixture of similar substances. Raoult's law may be adapted to non-ideal solutions by incorporating two factors that account for the interactions between molecules of different substances. The first factor is a correction for gas non-ideality, or deviations from the ideal-gas law. It is called the fugacity coefficient ($\phi_{p,i}$). The second, the activity coefficient $\gamma_i$, is a correction for interactions in the liquid phase between the different molecules.

This modified or extended Raoult's law is then written as

$$y_i \phi_{p,i} p = x_i \gamma_i p_i^\star.$$

== Real solutions ==
In many pairs of liquids, there is no uniformity of attractive forces, i.e., the adhesive (between dissimilar molecules) and cohesive forces (between similar molecules) are not uniform between the two liquids. Therefore, they deviate from Raoult's law, which applies only to ideal solutions.

Notably, when the concentration of A is small, its vapor pressure instead follows Henry's law, and likewise for substance B when its concentration is small.

=== Negative deviation ===
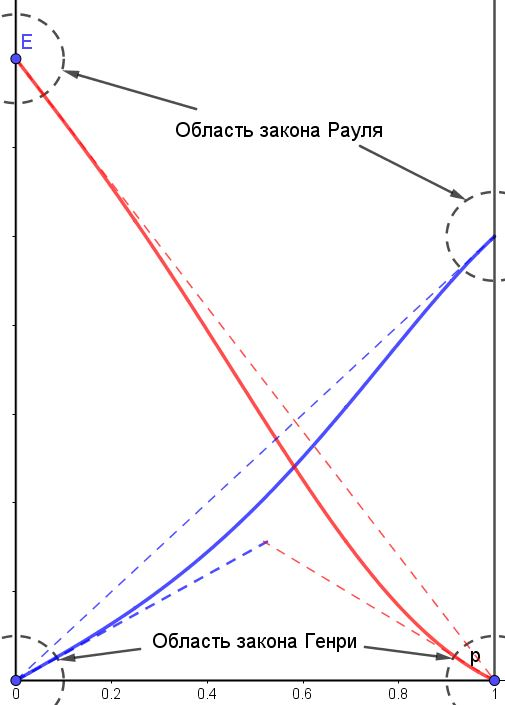
Negative deviation from Raoult's law

When the adhesion is stronger than the cohesion, fewer liquid particles turn into vapor thereby lowering the vapor pressure and leading to negative deviation in the graph.

For example, the system of chloroform (CHCl_{3}) and acetone (CH_{3}COCH_{3}) has a negative deviation from Raoult's law, indicating an attractive interaction between the two components that have been described as a hydrogen bond. The system HCl–water has a large enough negative deviation to form a minimum in the vapor pressure curve known as a (negative) azeotrope, corresponding to a mixture that evaporates without change of composition. When these two components are mixed, the reaction is exothermic as ion-dipole intermolecular forces of attraction are formed between the resulting ions (H_{3}O^{+} and Cl^{–}) and the polar water molecules so that ΔH_{mix} is negative.

=== Positive deviation ===
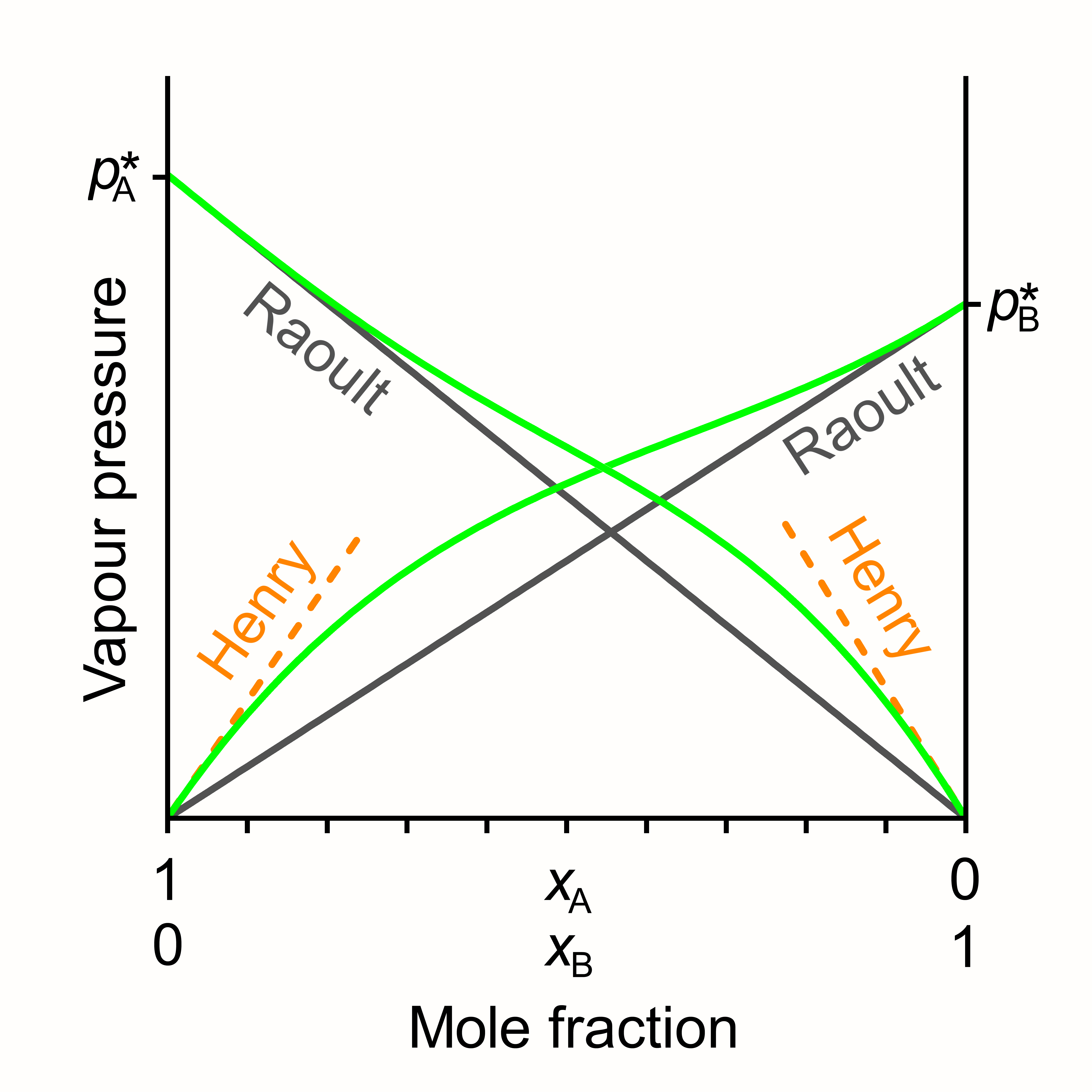
Positive deviation from Raoult's law

When the adhesion is weaker than cohesion, which is quite common, the liquid particles escape the solution more easily that increases the vapor pressure and leads to a positive deviation.

If the deviation is large, then the vapor pressure curve shows a maximum at a particular composition and forms a positive azeotrope (low-boiling mixture). Some mixtures in which this happens are (1) ethanol and water, (2) benzene and methanol, (3) carbon disulfide and acetone, (4) chloroform and ethanol, and (5) glycine and water. When these pairs of components are mixed, the process is endothermic as weaker intermolecular interactions are formed so that Δ_{mix}H is positive.

=== Mixed deviation ===
It is possible to have mixed deviations, which are positive for one component and negative for the other, and which switch between positive and negative while moving from $x=0$ to $x=1$. These are not merely theoretically possible, as actual examples of mixed deviation exist. The possible physical deviations are not entirely arbitrary however, as they are constrained by the Duhem–Margules equation: for example, if one component has positive deviation over the entire range then the other component cannot have negative deviation over the entire range.

== See also ==
- Antoine equation
- Atomic theory
- Azeotrope
- Dühring's rule
- Henry's law
- Köhler theory
- Solubility
