= Dissociation (chemistry) =

Separation of molecules or ionic compounds into smaller constituent entities

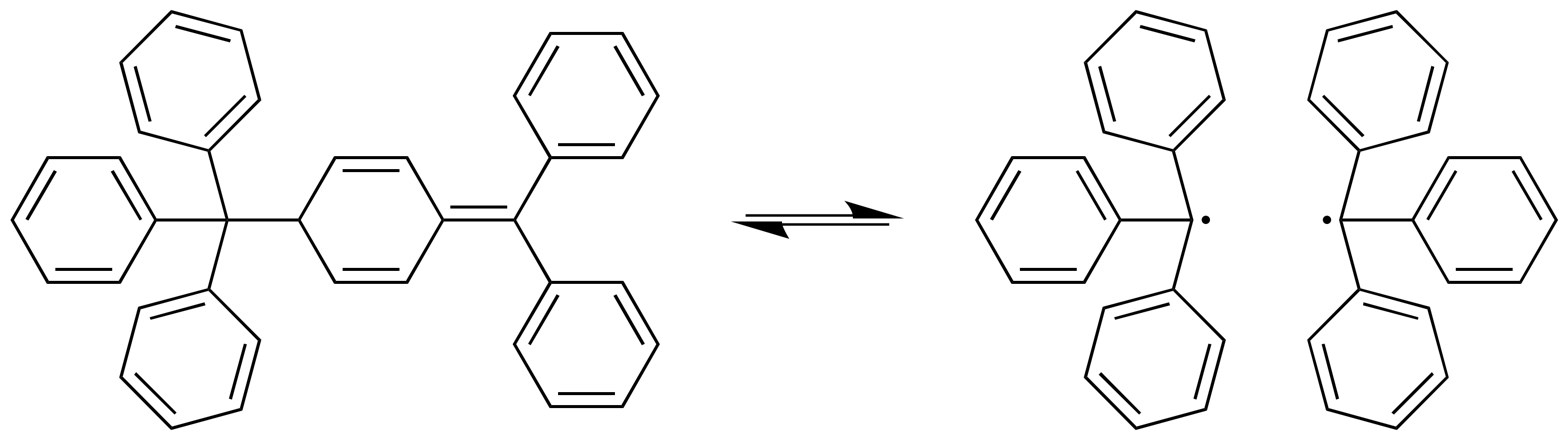
Dissociation of Gomberg's dimer

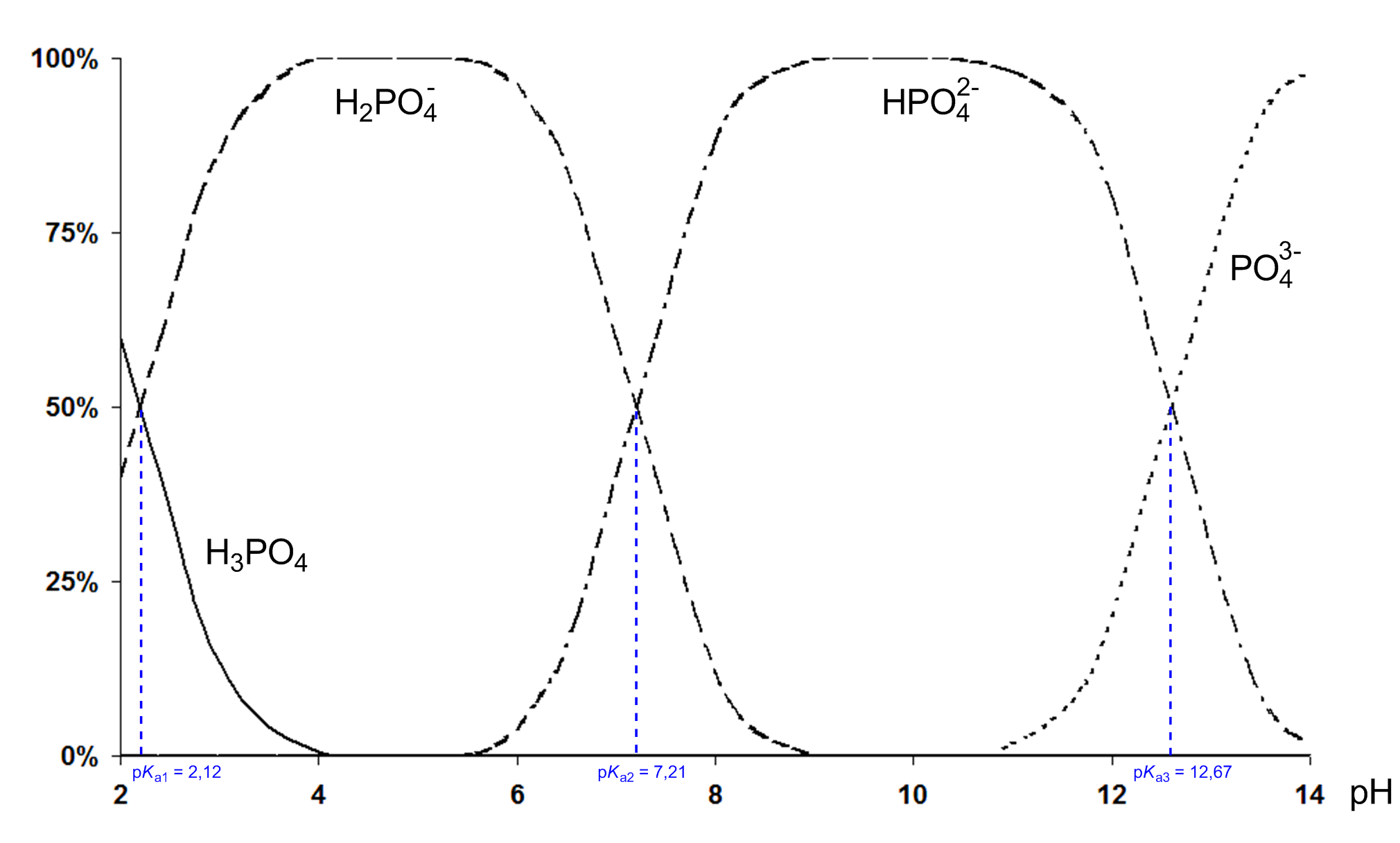
Dissociation diagram of phosphoric acid

Dissociation in chemistry is a general process in which molecules (or ionic compounds such as salts, or complexes) separate or split into other things such as atoms, ions, or radicals, usually in a reversible manner. For instance, when an acid dissolves in water, a covalent bond between an electronegative atom and a hydrogen atom is broken by heterolytic fission, which gives a proton (H^{+}) and a negative ion. Dissociation is the opposite of association or recombination.

== Dissociation constant ==
For reversible dissociations in a chemical equilibrium

$$\ce{AB <=> A + B}$$

the dissociation constant K_{d} is the ratio of dissociated to undissociated compound

$$K_d = \mathrm{\frac{[A] [B]}{[AB]}}$$

where the brackets denote the equilibrium concentrations of the species.

== Dissociation degree ==
The dissociation degree $\alpha$ is the fraction of original solute molecules that have dissociated. It is usually indicated by the Greek symbol α. More accurately, degree of dissociation refers to the amount of solute dissociated into ions or radicals per mole. In case of very strong acids and bases, degree of dissociation will be close to 1. Less powerful acids and bases will have lesser degree of dissociation. There is a simple relationship between this parameter and the van 't Hoff factor $i$. If the solute substance dissociates into $n$ ions, then

$$i = 1 + \alpha (n - 1)$$

For instance, for the following dissociation

$$\ce{KCl <=> K+ + Cl-}$$

As $n = 2$, we would have that $i = 1 + \alpha$.

== Salts ==
A video of sodium chloride crystals dissolving and dissociating in water

The dissociation of salts by solvation in a solution, such as water, means the separation of the anions and cations. The salt can be recovered by evaporation of the solvent.

An electrolyte refers to a substance that contains free ions and can be used as an electrically conductive medium. Most of the solute does not dissociate in a weak electrolyte, whereas in a strong electrolyte a higher ratio of solute dissociates to form free ions.

A weak electrolyte is a substance whose solute exists in solution mostly in the form of molecules (which are said to be "undissociated"), with only a small fraction in the form of ions. Simply because a substance does not readily dissolve does not make it a weak electrolyte. Acetic acid (CH_{3}COOH) and ammonium (NH^{+}_{4}) are good examples. Acetic acid is extremely soluble in water, but most of the compound dissolves into molecules, rendering it a weak electrolyte. Weak bases and weak acids are generally weak electrolytes. In an aqueous solution there will be some CH_{3}COOH and some CH_{3}COO^{−} and H^{+}.

A strong electrolyte is a solute that exists in solution completely or nearly completely as ions. Again, the strength of an electrolyte is defined as the percentage of solute that is ions, rather than molecules. The higher the percentage, the stronger the electrolyte. Thus, even if a substance is not very soluble, but does dissociate completely into ions, the substance is defined as a strong electrolyte. Similar logic applies to a weak electrolyte. Strong acids and bases are good examples, such as HCl and H_{2}SO_{4}. These will all exist as ions in an aqueous medium.

== Gases ==
The degree of dissociation in gases is denoted by the symbol α, where α refers to the percentage of gas molecules which dissociate. Various relationships between K_{p} and α exist depending on the stoichiometry of the equation. The example of dinitrogen tetroxide (N_{2}O_{4}) dissociating to nitrogen dioxide (NO_{2}) will be taken.
$$\ce{N2O4 <=> 2NO2}$$

If the initial concentration of dinitrogen tetroxide is 1 mole per litre, this will decrease by α at equilibrium giving, by stoichiometry, α moles of NO_{2}. The equilibrium constant (in terms of pressure) is given by the equation
$$K_p = \frac{p\bigl(\ce{NO2}\bigr)^2}{p \, \ce{N2O4}}$$

where p represents the partial pressure. Hence, through the definition of partial pressure and using p_{T} to represent the total pressure and x to represent the mole fraction;
$$K_p = \frac{p_T^2 \bigl(x \, \ce{NO2} \bigr)^2}{p_T\cdot x \, \ce{N2O4}} = \frac{p_T \bigl(x \, \ce{NO2} \bigr)^2}{x \, \ce{N2O4}}$$

The total number of moles at equilibrium is (1 − α) + 2α, which is equivalent to 1 + α. Thus, substituting the mole fractions with actual values in term of α and simplifying;
$$K_p = \frac{p_T(4\alpha^2)}{(1+\alpha)(1-\alpha)} = \frac{p_T(4\alpha^2)}{1-\alpha^2}$$

This equation is in accordance with Le Chatelier's principle. K_{p} will remain constant with temperature. The addition of pressure to the system will increase the value of p_{T}, so α must decrease to keep K_{p} constant. In fact, increasing the pressure of the equilibrium favours a shift to the left favouring the formation of dinitrogen tetroxide (as on this side of the equilibrium there is less pressure since pressure is proportional to number of moles) hence decreasing the extent of dissociation α.

== Acids in aqueous solution ==
The reaction of an acid in water solvent is often described as a dissociation

$$\ce{HA <=> H+ + A-}$$

where HA is a proton acid such as acetic acid, CH_{3}COOH. The double arrow means that this is an equilibrium process, with dissociation and recombination occurring at the same time. This implies that the acid dissociation constant

$$K_{\ce a} = \ce{\frac{[H^+] [A^-]}{[HA]}}$$

However a more explicit description is provided by the Brønsted–Lowry acid–base theory, which specifies that the proton H+ does not exist as such in solution but is instead accepted by (bonded to) a water molecule to form the hydronium ion H_{3}O^{+}.

The reaction can therefore be written as

$$\ce{HA + H2O <=> H3O+ + A-}$$

and better described as an ionization or formation of ions (for the case when HA has no net charge). The equilibrium constant is then

$$K_{\ce a} = \ce{\frac{[H_3O^+] [A^-]}{[HA]}}$$

where $\ce{[H_2O]}$ is not included because in dilute solution the solvent is essentially a pure liquid with a thermodynamic activity of one.

K_{a} is variously named a dissociation constant, an acid ionization constant, an acidity constant or an ionization constant. It serves as an indicator of the acid strength: stronger acids have a higher K_{a} value (and a lower pK_{a} value).

== Fragmentation ==
Fragmentation of a molecule can take place by a process of heterolysis or homolysis.

== Receptors ==
Receptors are proteins that bind small ligands. The dissociation constant K_{d} is used as indicator of the affinity of the ligand to the receptor. The higher the affinity of the ligand for the receptor the lower the K_{d} value (and the higher the pK_{d} value).

== See also ==
- Bond-dissociation energy
- Photodissociation, dissociation of molecules by photons (light, gamma rays, x-rays)
- Radiolysis, dissociation of molecules by ionizing radiation
- Thermal decomposition
