= Molality =

Amount of substance of solute divided by the mass of the solvent

In chemistry, molality is a measure of the amount of solute in a solution relative to a given mass of solvent. This contrasts with the definition of molarity which is based on a given volume of solution.

A commonly used unit for molality is moles of solute per kilogram solvent (mol/kg). A solution of concentration 1 mol/kg is often written as 1 molal (or 1 m).

== Definition ==
The molality (b), of a solution is defined as the amount of substance (in moles) of solute, n_{solute}, divided by the mass (in kg) of the solvent, m_{solvent}:

$$b = \frac{n_\mathrm{solute}}{m_\mathrm{solvent}}$$.

In the case of solutions with more than one solvent, molality can be defined for the mixed solvent considered as a pure pseudo-solvent. Instead of mole solute per kilogram solvent as in the binary case, units are defined as mole solute per kilogram mixed solvent.

== Origin ==
The term molality is formed in analogy to molarity which is the molar concentration of a solution. The earliest known use of the intensive property molality and of its adjectival unit, the now-deprecated molal, appears to have been published by G. N. Lewis and M. Randall in the 1923 publication of Thermodynamics and the Free Energies of Chemical Substances. Though the two terms are subject to being confused with one another, the molality and molarity of a dilute aqueous solution are nearly the same, as one kilogram of water (solvent) occupies the volume of 1 liter at room temperature and a small amount of solute has little effect on the volume.

== Unit ==
The SI unit for molality is moles per kilogram of solvent.

A solution with a molality of 3 mol/kg is often described as "3 molal", "3 m" or "3 m". However, following the SI system of units, the National Institute of Standards and Technology, the United States authority on measurement, considers the term "molal" and the unit symbol "m" to be obsolete, and suggests mol/kg or a related unit of the SI.

== Usage considerations ==
=== Advantages ===
The primary advantage of using molality as a measure of concentration is that molality only depends on the masses of solute and solvent, which are unaffected by variations in temperature and pressure. In contrast, solutions prepared volumetrically (e.g. molar concentration or mass concentration) are likely to change as temperature and pressure change. In many applications, this is a significant advantage because the mass, or the amount, of a substance is often more important than its volume (e.g. in a limiting reagent problem).

Another advantage of molality is the fact that the molality of one solute in a solution is independent of the presence or absence of other solutes.

=== Problem areas ===
Unlike all the other compositional properties listed in "Relation" section (below), molality depends on the choice of the substance to be called “solvent” in an arbitrary mixture. If there is only one pure liquid substance in a mixture, the choice is clear, but not all solutions are this clear-cut: in an alcohol–water solution, either one could be called the solvent; in an alloy, or solid solution, there is no clear choice and all constituents may be treated alike. In such situations, mass or mole fraction is the preferred compositional specification.

== Relation to other compositional quantities ==
In what follows, the solvent may be given the same treatment as the other constituents of the solution, such that the molality of the solvent of an n-solute solution, say b_{0}, is found to be nothing more than the reciprocal of its molar mass, M_{0} (expressed in the unit kg/mol):

$$b_0=\frac{n_0}{n_0 M_0}=\frac{1}{M_0}$$.

For the solutes the expression of molalities is similar:

$$b_i=\frac{n_i}{n_0 M_0}=\frac{x_i}{x_0 M_0} = \frac{c_i}{c_0 M_0}$$.

The expressions linking molalities to mass fractions and mass concentrations contain the molar masses of the solutes M_{i}:

$$b_i = \frac{n_i}{n_0 M_0} = \frac{w_i}{w_0 M_i} = \frac{\rho_i}{\rho_0 M_i}$$.

Similarly the equalities below are obtained from the definitions of the molalities and of the other compositional quantities.

The mole fraction of solvent can be obtained from the definition by dividing the numerator and denominator to the amount of solvent n_{0}:

$$x_0 = \frac{n_0}{n_0 + n_1 + n_2 + \displaystyle\sum_{j=3}^{n}{n_j}} = \frac{1}{1 + \frac{n_1}{n_0} + \frac{n_2}{n_0} + \displaystyle\sum_{j=3}^{n}\frac{n_j}{n_0}}$$.

Then the sum of ratios of the other mole amounts to the amount of solvent is substituted with expressions from below containing molalities:

$$\frac{n_i}{n_0} = b_i M_0$$

$$\sum_i^n \frac{n_i}{n_0} = M_0 \sum_i^n b_i$$

giving the result

$$x_0 = \frac{1}{1 + \displaystyle M_0 b_1 + M_0 b_2 + M_0 \displaystyle \sum_{i=3}^{n} b_i} = \frac{1}{1 + M_0 \displaystyle \sum_{i=1}^{n} b_i}$$.

=== Mass fraction ===
The conversions to and from the mass fraction, w_{1}, of the solute in a single-solute solution are

$$w_1=\frac{1}{1+\dfrac{1}{b_1 M_1}},\quad b_1=\frac{w_1}{(1-w_1)M_1} ,$$

where b_{1} is the molality and M_{1} is the molar mass of the solute.

More generally, for an n-solute/one-solvent solution, letting b_{i} and w_{i} be, respectively, the molality and mass fraction of the i-th solute,

$$w_i=w_0 b_i M_i,\quad b_i=\frac{w_i}{w_0 M_i}$$,

where M_{i} is the molar mass of the ith solute, and w_{0} is the mass fraction of the solvent, which is expressible both as a function of the molalities as well as a function of the other mass fractions,

$$w_0=\frac{1}{1+\displaystyle\sum_{j=1}^{n}{b_j M_j}}=1-\sum_{j=1}^{n}{w_j}$$.

Substitution gives:

$$w_i = \frac{b_i M_i}{1 + \displaystyle\sum_{j=1}^n b_j M_j}, \quad b_i = \frac{w_i}{\left(1 - \displaystyle\sum_{j=1}^n w_j\right) M_i}$$.

=== Mole fraction ===
The conversions to and from the mole fraction, x_{1} mole fraction of the solute in a single-solute solution are

$$x_1=\frac{1}{1+\dfrac{1}{M_0 b_1}},\quad b_1=\frac{x_1}{M_0(1-x_1)}$$,

where M_{0} is the molar mass of the solvent.

More generally, for an n-solute/one-solvent solution, letting x_{i} be the mole fraction of the ith solute,

$$x_i=x_0 M_0 b_i,\quad b_i=\frac{b_0 x_i}{x_0} = \frac{x_i}{M_0 x_0}$$,

where x_{0} is the mole fraction of the solvent, expressible both as a function of the molalities as well as a function of the other mole fractions:

$$x_0=\frac{1}{1+M_0\displaystyle\sum_{i=1}^{n}{b_i}}=1-\sum_{i=1}^{n}{x_i}$$.

Substitution gives:

$$x_i = \frac{M_0 b_i}{1 + M_0\displaystyle\sum_{j=1}^n b_j}, \quad b_i = \frac{x_i}{M_0  \left(1 - \displaystyle\sum_{j=1}^n x_j\right)}$$.

=== Molar concentration (molarity) ===
The conversions to and from the molar concentration, c_{1}, for one-solute solutions are

$$c_1 = \frac{\rho b_1}{1+ b_1 M_1},\quad b_1=\frac{c_1}{\rho-c_1M_1}$$,

where ρ is the mass density of the solution, b_{1} is the molality, and M_{1} is the molar mass (in kg/mol) of the solute.

For solutions with n solutes, the conversions are

$$c_i =c_0 M_0 b_i,\quad b_i=\frac{b_0 c_i}{c_0}$$,

where the molar concentration of the solvent c_{0} is expressible both as a function of the molalities as well as a function of the other molarities:

$$c_0=\frac{\rho b_0}{1+\displaystyle\sum_{j=1}^{n}{b_j M_j}}=\frac{\rho-\displaystyle\sum_{j=1}^{n}{c_i M_i}}{M_0}$$.

Substitution gives:

$$c_i=\frac{\rho b_i}{1+\displaystyle\sum_{j=1}^n {b_j M_j}},\quad b_i=\frac{c_i}{\rho-\displaystyle\sum_{j=1}^n {c_j M_j}}$$,

=== Mass concentration ===
The conversions to and from the mass concentration, ρ_{solute}, of a single-solute solution are

$$\rho_\mathrm{solute} = \frac{\rho b M}{1+b M},\quad b=\frac{\rho_\mathrm{solute}}{M \left(\rho-\rho_\mathrm{solute}\right)}$$,

or

$$\rho_1 = \frac{\rho b_1 M_1}{1+b_1 M_1},\quad b_1=\frac{\rho_1}{M_1 \left(\rho-\rho_1\right)}$$,

where ρ is the mass density of the solution, b_{1} is the molality, and M_{1} is the molar mass of the solute.

For the general n-solute solution, the mass concentration of the ith solute, ρ_{i}, is related to its molality, b_{i}, as follows:

$$\rho_i = \rho_0 b_i M_i,\quad b_i=\frac{\rho_i}{\rho_0 M_i}$$,

where the mass concentration of the solvent, ρ_{0}, is expressible both as a function of the molalities as well as a function of the other mass concentrations:

$$\rho_0=\frac{\rho}{1+\displaystyle\sum_{j=1}^n b_j M_j}=\rho-\sum_{i=1}^{n}{\rho_i}$$.

Substitution gives:

$$\rho_i=\frac{\rho b_i M_i}{1+\displaystyle\sum_{j=1}^n b_j M_j}\quad b_i=\frac{\rho_i}{M_i \left(\rho-\displaystyle \sum_{j=1}^n \rho_j\right)}$$.

=== Equal ratios ===
Alternatively, one may use just the last two equations given for the compositional property of the solvent in each of the preceding sections, together with the relationships given below, to derive the remainder of properties in that set:

$$\frac{b_i}{b_j}=\frac{x_i}{x_j}=\frac{c_i}{c_j}=\frac{\rho_i M_j}{\rho_j M_i}=\frac{w_i M_j}{w_j M_i}$$,

where i and j are subscripts representing all the constituents, the n solutes plus the solvent.

=== Example of conversion ===
An acid mixture consists of 0.76, 0.04, and 0.20 mass fractions of 70% HNO_{3}, 49% HF, and H_{2}O, where the percentages refer to mass fractions of the bottled acids carrying a balance of H_{2}O. The first step is determining the mass fractions of the constituents:

$$\begin{align}
w_\mathrm{HNO_3} &= 0.70 \times 0.76 = 0.532\\
w_\mathrm{HF} &= 0.49 \times 0.04 = 0.0196\\
w_\mathrm{H_2O} &= 1 - w_\mathrm{HNO_3} - w_\mathrm{HF} = 0.448\\
\end{align}$$.

The approximate molar masses in kg/mol are

$$M_\mathrm{HNO_3}=0.063\ \mathrm{kg/mol},\quad M_\mathrm{HF}=0.020\ \mathrm{kg/mol},\ M_\mathrm{H_2O}=0.018\ \mathrm{kg/mol}$$.

First derive the molality of the solvent, in mol/kg,

$$b_\mathrm{H_2O}=\frac{1}{M_\mathrm{H_2O}}=\frac{1}{0.018}\ \mathrm{mol/kg}$$,

and use that to derive all the others by use of the equal ratios:

$$\frac{b_\mathrm{HNO_3}}{b_\mathrm{H_2O}}=\frac{w_\mathrm{HNO_3}M_\mathrm{H_2O}}{w_\mathrm{H_2O}M_\mathrm{HNO_3}}\quad \therefore b_\mathrm{HNO_3}=18.83\ \mathrm{mol/kg}$$.

Actually, b_{H_{2}O} cancels out, because it is not needed. In this case, there is a more direct equation: we use it to derive the molality of HF:

$$b_\mathrm{HF}=\frac{w_\mathrm{HF}}{w_\mathrm{H_2O}M_\mathrm{HF}}=2.19\ \mathrm{mol/kg}$$.

The mole fractions may be derived from this result:

$$x_\mathrm{H_2O}=\frac{1}{1+M_\mathrm{H_2O}\left(b_\mathrm{HNO_3}+b_\mathrm{HF}\right)}=0.726$$,
$$\frac{x_\mathrm{HNO_3}}{x_\mathrm{H_2O}}=\frac{b_\mathrm{HNO_3}}{b_\mathrm{H_2O}}\quad \therefore x_\mathrm{HNO_3}=0.246$$,
$$x_\mathrm{HF}=1-x_\mathrm{HNO_3}-x_\mathrm{H_2O}=0.029$$.

=== Osmolality ===
Osmolality is a variation of molality that takes into account only solutes that contribute to a solution's osmotic pressure. It is measured in osmoles of the solute per kilogram of water. This unit is frequently used in medical laboratory results in place of osmolarity, because it can be measured simply by depression of the freezing point of a solution, or cryoscopy (see also: osmostat and colligative properties).

== Relation to apparent (molar) properties ==
Molality appears in the expression of the apparent (molar) volume of a solute as a function of the molality b of that solute (and density of the solution and solvent):

$${}^\phi\tilde{V}_1 = \frac{V - V_0}{n_1} = \left(\frac{m}{\rho} - \frac{m_0}{\rho_0^0}\right) \frac{1}{n_1} = \left(\frac{m_1 + m_0}{\rho} - \frac{m_0}{\rho_0^0}\right) \frac{1}{n_1} = \left(\frac{m_0}{\rho} - \frac{m_0}{\rho_0^0}\right)\frac{1}{n_1} + \frac{m_1}{\rho  n_1}$$,

$${}^\phi\tilde{V}_1 = \frac{1}{b_1}\left( \frac{1}{\rho} - \frac{1}{\rho_0^0}\right) + \frac{M_1}{\rho}$$.

For multicomponent systems the relation is slightly modified by the sum of molalities of solutes. Also a total molality and a mean apparent molar volume can be defined for the solutes together and also a mean molar mass of the solutes as if they were a single solute. In this case the first equality from above is modified with the mean molar mass M of the pseudosolute instead of the molar mass of the single solute:

${}^\phi\tilde{V}_{12..} = \frac{1}{b_T}\left( \frac{1}{\rho} - \frac{1}{\rho_0^0}\right) + \frac{M}{\rho}$, $M = \sum y_i M_i$

$y_i = \frac {b_i}{b_T}$, y_{i,j} being ratios involving molalities of solutes i,j and the total molality b_{T}.

The sum of products molalities - apparent molar volumes of solutes in their binary solutions equals the product between the sum of molalities of solutes and apparent molar volume in ternary or multicomponent solution.

$${}^\phi\tilde{V}_{123..} (b_1 + b_2 + b_3 + \ldots) = b_{11} {}^\phi\tilde{V}_1 + b_{22} {}^\phi\tilde{V}_{2} + b_{33} {}^\phi\tilde{V}_{3} + \ldots$$.

=== Relation to apparent molar properties and activity coefficients ===
For concentrated ionic solutions the activity coefficient of the electrolyte is split into electric and statistical components.

The statistical part includes molality b, hydration index number h, the number of ions from the dissociation and the ratio r_{a} between the apparent molar volume of the electrolyte and the molar volume of water.

Concentrated solution statistical part of the activity coefficient is:

$$\ln \gamma_s = \frac{h- \nu}{\nu} \ln \left(1 + \frac{br_a}{55.5}\right) - \frac{h}{\nu} \ln \left(1 - \frac{br_a}{55.5}\right) + \frac{br_a\left(r_a + h -\nu\right)}{55.5 \left(1 + \frac{br_a}{55.5}\right)}$$.

== Molalities of a ternary or multicomponent solution ==
The molalities of solutes b_{1}, b_{2} in a ternary solution obtained by mixing two binary aqueous solutions with different solutes (say a sugar and a salt or two different salts) are different than the initial molalities of the solutes b_{ii} in their binary solutions:

$b_{1}=\frac{m_{11}}{M_1 (m_{01} + m_{02})} = \frac{n_{11}}{m_{01} + m_{02}} = \frac{b_{11}}{1 + \frac{m_{02}}{m_{01}}}$,

$b_{2}=\frac{m_{22}}{M_2 (m_{01} + m_{02})} = \frac{n_{22}}{m_{01} + m_{02}} = \frac{b_{22}}{ \frac{m_{01}}{m_{02}} + 1}$,

$b_{11}=\frac{m_{11}}{M_1 m_{01}} = \frac{n_{11}}{m_{01}}$,

$b_{22}=\frac{m_{22}}{M_2 m_{02}} = \frac{n_{22}}{m_{02}}$.

The content of solvent in mass fractions w_{01} and w_{02} from each solution of masses m_{s1} and m_{s2} to be mixed as a function of initial molalities is calculated. Then the amount (mol) of solute from each binary solution is divided by the sum of masses of water after mixing:

$b_1 = \frac{1}{M_1}\frac {w_{11} m_{s1}}{w_{01}m_{s1} + w_{02}m_{s2}} = \frac{1}{M_1}\frac {w_{11} m_{s1}}{(1 - w_{11})m_{s1} + (1 - w_{22})m_{s2}} = \frac{1}{M_1} \frac {w_{11} m_{s1}}{m_{s1} + m_{s2} - w_{11}m_{s1} - w_{22}m_{s2}}$,

$b_2 = \frac{1}{M_2}\frac {w_{22} m_{s2}}{w_{01}m_{s1} + w_{02}m_{s2}} = \frac{1}{M_2}\frac {w_{22} m_{s2}}{(1 - w_{11})m_{s1} + (1 - w_{22})m_{s2}} = \frac{1}{M_2} \frac {w_{22} m_{s2}}{m_{s1} + m_{s2} - w_{11}m_{s1} - w_{22}m_{s2}}$.

Mass fractions of each solute in the initial solutions w_{11} and w_{22} are expressed as a function of the initial molalities b_{11}, b_{22}:

$w_{11}=\frac{b_{11} M_1}{b_{11} M_1 + 1}$,

$w_{22}=\frac{b_{22} M_2}{b_{22} M_2 + 1}$.

These expressions of mass fractions are substituted in the final molalitaties:

$b_1 = \frac{1}{M_1} \frac{1}{\frac{1}{w_{11}} + \frac {m_{s2}}{w_{11}m_{s1}} -1 - \frac{w_{22}m_{s2}}{w_{11}m_{s1}}}$,

$b_2 = \frac{1}{M_2} \frac{1}{\frac {m_{s1}}{w_{22}m_{s2}} + \frac{1}{w_{22}} - \frac{w_{11}m_{s1}}{w_{22}m_{s2}} - 1}$.

The results for a ternary solution can be extended to a multicomponent solution (with more than two solutes).

=== From the molalities of the binary solutions ===
The molalities of the solutes in a ternary solution can be expressed also from molalities in the binary solutions and their masses:

$b_{1}=\frac{m_{11}}{M_1 (m_{01} + m_{02})} = \frac{n_{11}}{m_{01} + m_{02}}$,

$b_{2}=\frac{m_{22}}{M_2 (m_{01} + m_{02})} = \frac{n_{22}}{m_{01} + m_{02}}$.

The binary solution molalities are:

$b_{11}=\frac{m_{11}}{M_1 m_{01}} = \frac{n_{11}}{m_{01}}$,

$b_{22}=\frac{m_{22}}{M_2 m_{02}} = \frac{n_{22}}{m_{02}}$.

The masses of the solutes determined from the molalities of the solutes and the masses of water can be substituted in the expressions of the masses of solutions:

$m_{s1} = m_{01} + m_{11} = m_{01} (1 + b_{11} M_1)$.

Similarly for the mass of the second solution:

$m_{s2} = m_{02} + m_{22} = m_{02} (1 + b_{22} M_2)$.

One can obtain the masses of water present in the sum from the denominator of the molalities of the solutes in the ternary solutions as functions of binary molalities and masses of solution:

$m_{01} = \frac{m_{s1}}{1 + b_{11} M_1}$,

$m_{02} = \frac{m_{s2}}{1 + b_{22} M_2}$.

Thus the ternary molalities are:

$b_{1} = \frac{b_{11} m_{01}}{m_{01} + m_{02}} = \frac{b_{11}}{1 + \frac{m_{02}}{m_{01}}} = \frac{b_{11}}{1 + \frac{m_{s2}}{m_{s1}} \frac{1 + b_{11} M_1}{1 + b_{22} M_2}}$,

$b_{2} = \frac{b_{22} m_{02}}{m_{01} + m_{02}} = \frac{b_{22}}{1 + \frac{m_{01}}{m_{02}}} = \frac{b_{22}}{1 + \frac{m_{s1}}{m_{s2}} \frac{1 + b_{22} M_2}{1 + b_{11} M_1}}$.

For solutions with three or more solutes the denominator is a sum of the masses of solvent in the n binary solutions which are mixed:

$b_{1}=\frac{m_{11}}{M_1 (m_{01} + m_{02} + m_{03} + ...)} = \frac{n_{11}}{m_{01} + m_{02} + ..} = \frac{b_{11}}{1 + \frac{m_{02}}{m_{01}} + \frac{m_{03}}{m_{01}} + ...}$,

$b_{2}=\frac{m_{22}}{M_2 (m_{01} + m_{02} + m_{03} + ...)} = \frac{n_{22}}{m_{01} + m_{02} +...}$,

$b_{3}=\frac{m_{33}}{M_3 (m_{01} + m_{02} + m_{03} + ...)} = \frac{n_{33}}{m_{01} + m_{02} + ...}$.

== See also ==
- Molarity
