= Astroblast =

Astroblast may refer to:

- A version of Astrosmash, a 1981 video game
- Astroblast!, a children's cartoon on the Sprout network
- A short clip by Alexandre Lehmann from the episode "Worship" of the Adult Swim show Off the Air
- A stomp rocket sold in the late 1970s
- A differentiated neural stem cell which becomes an astrocyte
