= List of cooling baths =

This article contains a list of cooling bath mixtures.

== Table ==
| Cooling Agent | Organic Solvent or Inorganic Salt | T (°C) | Notes | Reference |
|---|---|---|---|---|
| Dry ice | p-Xylene | +13 | | |
| Dry ice | p-Dioxane | +12 | | |
| Dry ice | Cyclohexane | +6 | | |
| Dry ice | Benzene | +5 | | |
| Dry ice | Formamide | +2 | | |
| Ice | Water | 0 | | |
| Ice | Ammonium chloride | −5 | 0.3 to 1 ratio of salt to ice. | |
| Liquid N_{2} | Aniline | −6 | | |
| Ice | Sodium thiosulfate pentahydrate | −8 | 1.1 to 1 ratio of salt to ice. | |
| Ice | Calcium chloride hexahydrate | −10 | 1 to 2.5 ratio of salt to ice. | |
| Liquid N_{2} | Ethylene glycol | −10.5 | | |
| Ice | Acetone | −10 | 1 to 1 ratio of acetone to ice. | |
| Liquid N_{2} | Cycloheptane | −12 | | |
| Dry ice | Benzyl alcohol | −15 | | |
| Dry ice | Ethylene glycol | −15 | | |
| Ice | Sodium chloride | −20 | 1 to 3 ratio of salt to ice. | |
| Dry ice | Tetrachloroethylene | −22 | | |
| Dry ice | Carbon Tetrachloride | −22.8 | | |
| Dry ice | 1,3-Dichlorobenzene | −25 | | |
| Dry ice | o-Xylene | −29 | | |
| Liquid N_{2} | Bromobenzene | −30 | | |
| Dry ice | m-Toluidine | −32 | | |
| Dry ice | 3-Heptanone | −38 | | |
| Ice | Calcium chloride hexahydrate | −40 to −50 | 1 to 0.8 ratio of salt to ice. | |
| Dry ice | Acetonitrile | −41 | | |
| Dry ice | Pyridine | −42 | | |
| Dry ice | Cyclohexanone | -46 | | |
| Dry ice | m-Xylene | -47 | | |
| Dry ice | Diethyl carbitol | -52 | | |
| Dry ice | n-Octane | -56 | | |
| Dry ice | Diisopropyl ether | -60 | | |
| Dry ice | Chloroform | -61 | | |
| Liquid N_{2} | Chloroform | -63 | | |
| Dry ice | Ethanol | -72 | Note: without the addition of ethylene glycol, temp is -78 °C. | |
| Dry ice | Trichloroethylene | -73 | | |
| Dry ice | Isopropyl alcohol | -77 | | |
| Liquid N_{2} | Butyl acetate | -77 | | |
| Dry ice | Acetone | -78 | | |
| Liquid N_{2} | Isoamyl acetate | -79 | | |
| Dry ice | Sulfur dioxide | -82 | | |
| Liquid N_{2} | Ethyl Acetate | -84 | | |
| Liquid N_{2} | n-Butanol | -89 | | |
| Liquid N_{2} | Hexane | -94 | | |
| Liquid N_{2} | Acetone | -94.6 | | |
| Liquid N_{2} | Toluene | -95.1 | | |
| Liquid N_{2} | Methanol | -98 | | |
| Liquid N_{2} | Cyclohexene | -104 | | |
| Liquid N_{2} | Isooctane | -107 | | |
| Liquid N_{2} | Ethyl iodide | -109 | | |
| Liquid N_{2} | Carbon disulfide | -110 | | |
| Liquid N_{2} | Butyl bromide | -112 | | |
| Liquid N_{2} | Diethyl ether | -116 | | |
| Liquid N_{2} | Ethanol | -116 | | |
| Liquid N_{2} | Ethyl bromide | -119 | | |
| Liquid N_{2} | Acetaldehyde | -124 | | |
| Liquid N_{2} | Methylcyclohexane | -126 | | |
| Liquid N_{2} | n-Propanol | -127 | | |
| Liquid N_{2} | n-Pentane | -131 | | |
| Liquid N_{2} | 1,5-Hexadiene | -141 | | |
| Liquid N_{2} | Isopentane | -160 | | |
| Liquid N_{2} | (none) | -196 | | |
| Liquid He | (none) | -269 | | |
