= Adrien-Jean-Pierre Thilorier =

French inventor (1790–1844)

- Born: 16 February 1790; Paris, Kingdom of France
- Died: 2 December 1844 (aged 54)
- Known for: Development of a machine for compressing gases, first production of dry ice
- Scientific career
- Fields: Technology
- Workplaces: The French Post Office

Adrien-Jean-Pierre Thilorier (16 February 1790 – 2 December 1844) was a French inventor who was the first person to produce solid carbon dioxide ("dry ice").

== Early years ==
Adrien-Jean-Pierre Thilorier was born in Paris, France, on 16 February 1790. He was the son of a lawyer, Jean-Charles Thilorier (1756-1818). Jean-Charles achieved some notoriety: In 1786, he served as defense attorney to Count Alessandro di Cagliostro in the "Affair of the Queen's Necklace". In this affair, a French cardinal (the Cardinal de Rohan) tried to ingratiate himself with the queen of France (Marie Antoinette) by buying for her—through intermediaries—a diamond necklace. However, the intermediaries proved to be con men who defrauded the cardinal and the jewelers. Count Cagliostro was suspected of being involved in the fraud and was arrested, but Thilorier won a verdict of not guilty. Jean-Charles was also interested in science and mechanics: He invented a radeau-plongeur (diving wheel) to allow vehicles to cross rivers. In 1800, he designed a poêle fumivore (smoke-eating stove; i.e., smokeless stove). In 1803, he published a pamphlet on meteorites, in 1812, he published a pamphlet on comets, and in 1815, he published a four-volume work on science.

Nothing is known about where Adrien Thilorier received his scientific education, although his father obviously was interested in the subject. Adrien may have been trained as a lawyer.

Mention of Thilorier's technical work first appeared in 1826: he developed and patented a "hydrostatic lamp" for lighthouses. As the lamp burned and consumed its oil, a dense aqueous solution of zinc sulfate flowed from the solution's reservoir into the oil reservoir, displacing the oil and thereby maintaining a steady flow of oil to the lamp's wick.

By 1828, competing versions of Thilorier's lamp had appeared on the market, and Thilorier was upset by what he regarded as patent infringement. (Thilorier's lamp was a refinement of similar "hydrostatic lamps", which had been patented by the Girard brothers on 15 December 1804 and by Mr. Verzy on 8 March 1810.) Thilorier asked the French Academy of Sciences to investigate the matter, which they did; but Thilorier didn't receive much satisfaction as the academy simply stated that the lamps of Thilorier and his competitors were all better than those of the Girard brothers. Nevertheless, Thilorier continued to patent improvements to his lamp in 1828 and 1832 and in 1835. In 1835, Thilorier, with Mr. Serrurot (a lamp maker), received a patent for an improved lamp, which was called a lampe-autostatique. In 1837, Thilorier, with Mssrs. Serrurot and Sorel, received a patent for an apparatus that heated liquids by using thermal expansion of the liquid and a siphon to circulate liquids between a heater and a holding tank.

== Thilorier's compressor ==
By 1829, Adrien Thilorier had developed a machine for compressing gases. A wealthy French aristocrat, Baron Montyon (1733-1820), had endowed a set of prizes, which were awarded annually by the French Academy. One of the prizes was for mechanical improvements. Thilorier entered his compressor in the competition and won the Montyon prize of 1829–1,500 francs. The compressor consisted of three cylinders: the largest cylinder had a diameter of 7.5 cm and the piston in it had a stroke of 14.6 cm; the intermediate cylinder had a diameter of 2.25 cm and its piston had a stroke of 14.6 cm; the smallest cylinder had a diameter of 0.6 cm and its piston had a stroke of 24.7 cm. The compressor was powered by a rocker arm, which in turn was powered by a team of ten men. The largest and intermediate cylinders were positioned symmetrically on opposite sides of the rocker arm's axis; the smallest cylinder was placed on the same side of the axis as the intermediate cylinder but twice as far from the rocker arm's axis. During one half of each cycle of the rocker arm, each piston would compress the gas within its cylinder; during the next half cycle, the gas would be transferred (presumably through a check valve) to the next cylinder, to be compressed further. The compressor was capable of producing a pressure of 1,000 atmospheres.

Thilorier subsequently made several improvements to his compressor. One problem with his original compressor was that the effort that was required to compress the gas was greatest at the bottom of the piston's stroke, at which point the gas's pressure was greatest. Thilorier solved this problem by using a fusée, a device that watch makers used to allow a watch's mainspring to exert a constant torque as the mainspring unwound and its force became weaker. Thilorier reversed the function of the fusée: in his compressor, the fusée allowed a constant force that was supplied by the compressor's source of power (men) to be converted into a force that increased as the piston neared the bottom of its stroke. Thanks to this modification, one man could now power the compressor instead of the ten men that had been required earlier. He also changed the method of cooling the compressor, and he reduced the number of cylinders from three to two. He obtained a patent for this improved compressor.

Thilorier entered his improved compressor in the competition for the Montyon prize of 1830—and again won the prize for mechanical improvements (700 francs). He foresaw several uses for the products of his compressor: Initially he thought that compressed air could power a cannon. However, he later suggested that compressed air could be used to provide a portable source of air for undersea divers (such as Paul Lemaire d'Angerville), to carbonate soda water, to force oils and syrups through filters, to serve as the fluid in a hydraulic press, or to power a vehicle or even a submarine.

In 1832, Thilorier won the Montyon prize for mechanical improvements yet again, after submitting a "hydrostatic vacuum pump". It was a type of mercury pump: mercury flowed through a tube to which was joined a tube from the vessel that was to be evacuated; the flow of mercury trapped bubbles of air from the vessel and then transported the bubbles away from the vessel. Thilorier was awarded 300 francs.

In 1832, French government documents list Thilorier as an employee of the French Post Office, residing in Paris at no. 21 Place Vendôme.

== Apparatus for producing liquid carbon dioxide ==
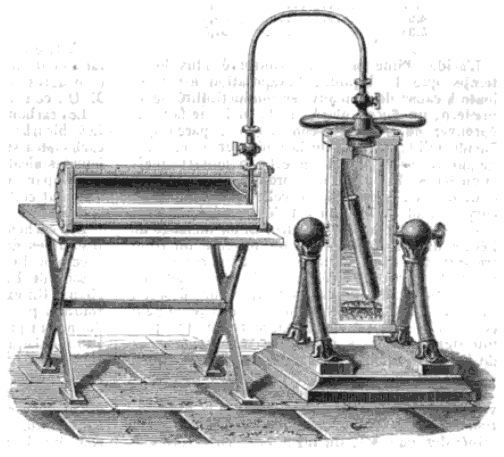
Mareska and Donny's version (1845) of A.J.P. Thilorier's apparatus for making liquid carbon dioxide, showing the generator (right) and the receptacle (left).

In 1834, Thilorier sent the French Academy of Sciences a letter in which he described experiments with liquid carbon dioxide, which had been produced by a new apparatus, by means of which " … he obtained, by chemical means, and in a few moments, a liter of liquefied carbonic acid [i.e., carbon dioxide]."

Thilorier's original apparatus for liquefying carbon dioxide used tanks made of cast iron. However, cast iron is brittle and so there was a danger that such a tank might rupture under pressure. The apparatus could be dangerous: On 30 December 1840, Osmin Hervy, who prepared scientific demonstrations for lectures at the School of Pharmacy in Paris, was operating one of Thilorier's machines when the gas-generating cylinder exploded. Shrapnel broke Hervy's legs, one of which had to be amputated; he died of infection a few days later. To reduce the danger of explosion, the cast iron was replaced with wrought iron.

By 1845, the Belgian chemists Daniel-Joseph-Benoît Mareska (1803-1858) and François-Marie-Louis Donny (1822-1896) had replaced the iron with copper and lead. A description of the apparatus and its operation was provided by the French chemist Charles-Adolphe Wurtz:

The apparatus is composed of a generator and a receptacle; the generator is a cylindrical lead boiler, covered with red copper and reinforced with pieces of forged iron. The capacity of this boiler is 6-7 liters. The generator is suspended between the two points of a cast iron base. The receptacle is formed from a vessel of lead contained in a cylinder of copper surrounded by rings of iron. The opening of the generator is sealed by a screw cap, pierced along its [i.e., the cap's] axis and fitted with a valve. The receptacle likewise bears an opening on its upper edge; one inserts in this opening a copper tube which descends almost to the bottom of the receptacle and which is fitted on the outside with a valve. One establishes a connection between the receptacle and the generator by means of a copper tube. In order to produce carbonic acid, one introduces into the generator 1,800 grams of sodium bicarbonate, 4½ liters of water at about 35° [C, 95°F], and a cylindrical copper cup containing 1 kilogram of concentrated sulfuric acid; one places it [i.e., the copper cup] along the axis of the generator, one closes it [i.e., the generator] and one rocks it around its axis [i.e., the two points of support of the cast iron base], in a way that the acid flows and reacts with the bicarbonate; at the end of ten minutes one opens the valves in order to allow the carbonic acid to pass into the receptacle. The acid distills by virtue of the difference in temperature that exists between the two parts of the apparatus; one proceeds to a new preparation of carbonic acid that one allows to pass in the same way into the receptacle; by repeating [this procedure] five or six times, one can accumulate up to 2 liters of liquid [carbonic acid].

Thilorier was not the first person to liquefy carbon dioxide: Michael Faraday had liquefied it in 1823. However, with an ample and reliable supply of liquid carbon dioxide, Thilorier was able to observe and measure its properties, such as its vapor density and its extraordinary rate of expansion with temperature, under a wide range of conditions.

== First production of "dry ice" ==
At the 12 October 1835 meeting of the French Academy of Sciences, a letter from Adrien Thilorier was read in which he stated that he had solidified carbon dioxide:

Original: Si l'on dirige un jet d'acide carbonique dans l'intérieur d'une petite fiole de verre, elle se remplit promptement, et presque en entier, d'une matièr blanche, pulvérulente, floconneuse, qui adhère fortement aux parois, et qu'on ne peut retirer qu'en brisant la bouteille.

Translation: If one directs a jet of [liquid] carbonic acid [i.e., carbon dioxide] into the interior of a small glass vial, it quickly fills, and almost completely, with a material [that is] white, powdery, fluffy, which adheres strongly to the walls [of the vial], and which one can remove only by breaking the bottle.

What is particularly interesting about Thilorier's discovery of dry ice is that he did not realize that he had solidified carbon dioxide until a group of scientists from the French Academy of Sciences explained to him what he had accomplished:

Original: M. Thénard fait remarquer que M. Thilorier n'avait pas encore imaginé, au moment de la visite des commissaires de l'Académie, que la substance blanchâtre obtenue par lui fût de l'acide carbonique solide. Ce fait, dit-il, a été reconnue et constaté par la commission: c'est elle qui a soumis l'acide à la plupart des expériences citées par l'auteur.

Translation: Mr. Thénard [i.e., French chemist Louis Jacques Thénard (1777 – 1857)] noted that Mr. Thilorier had still not imagined, at the time of the visit of commissioners of the Academy, that the whitish substance obtained by him was solid carbonic acid. This fact, he says, was recognized and noted by the committee: it is they who submitted the acid to most of the experiments cited by the author [i.e., Thilorier].

Thilorier thought that the liquid carbon dioxide had caused water vapor in the air to freeze on the vial; he was puzzled when the "snow" sublimated instead of melting.

Thilorier reported to the French Academy of Sciences the properties of solid carbon dioxide. News of Thilorier's achievement was published not only within France but in Germany, Britain, and the United States.

The French positivist Auguste Comte was so impressed by Thilorier's investigations of gases that he devoted the twentieth day of the ninth month of his positivist calendar to British chemist John Dalton—and to Thilorier.

When dry ice was mixed with diethyl ether, it was called "Thilorier's mixture", presumably since Thilorier had noted in 1835 that a mixture of liquid carbon dioxide and ether produced extreme cold when sprayed on objects. It was subsequently found that under reduced pressure, temperatures as low as −110 °C could be maintained. These mixtures ("dry ice baths") could thus be used to maintain low temperatures during experiments.

== Mistaken identification ==
Unfortunately, in almost all of his technical articles, Adrien Thilorier gave his name simply as "Thilorier"; similarly, whenever others referred to him in technical articles, his name was also given only as "Thilorier". This impeded efforts by scholars to identify him subsequently. The confusion was compounded when Paul Thénard wrote a biography of his father, Louis Thénard, the chemist who explained to Thilorier in 1835 that his "snow" was actually solidified carbon dioxide. In a footnote of that biography, Paul Thénard identified the "Thilorier" who discovered dry ice as "Charles-Saint-Ange Thilorier", a student at the École polytechnique in the class of 1815. This (mistaken) identification was mentioned by Duane H. D. Roller, a graduate student at Harvard University, in a paper that was published in 1952. Consequently, many sources claim that Charles-Saint-Ange Thilorier discovered dry ice.

During the 1960s, Madeleine Ambrière-Fargeaud, a scholar in France, was trying to identify the person who served as the model for a "mad scientist" character, Balthazar Claës, in Honoré de Balzac's novel La Recherche de l’absolu (The Quest of the Absolute). Her research suggested that Claës was inspired (in part) by Adrien-Jean-Pierre Thilorier. By 2003, Joost Mertens, a Dutch historian of science, had verified many of the findings that Ms. Ambrière-Fargeaud had made about Thilorier.

That "Thilorier" is actually Adrien-Jean-Pierre Thilorier is proved by French government documents, especially patents. His 1826 patent for a hydrostatic lamp lists his name as "Thilorier (Adrien-Jean-Pierre)" of Paris. His 1831 patent for a gas compressor also lists his name as "Thilorier (Adrien-Jean-Pierre)" and describes him as an employee of the "Administration des postes" (i.e., the Post Office) in Paris. In 1832, the Bulletin of the laws of the kingdom of France also lists him as "Thilorier (Adrien-Jean-Pierre)" and as an employee of the Post Office, who resided at number 21 on the Place Vendôme in Paris, and as the inventor of a gas compressor. In 1835, the government bulletin La France industrielle lists him as "Thilorier (Adrien-Jean-Pierre)" residing at no. 4 on rue de Bouloi in Paris and as the recipient of a patent for a hydrostatic lamp. In 1836, The London Journal of Arts and Sciences; and Repertory of Patent Inventions lists him by his full name as the recipient of a patent for a hydrostatic lamp.
