= Sodium bicarbonate rocket =

Model rocket

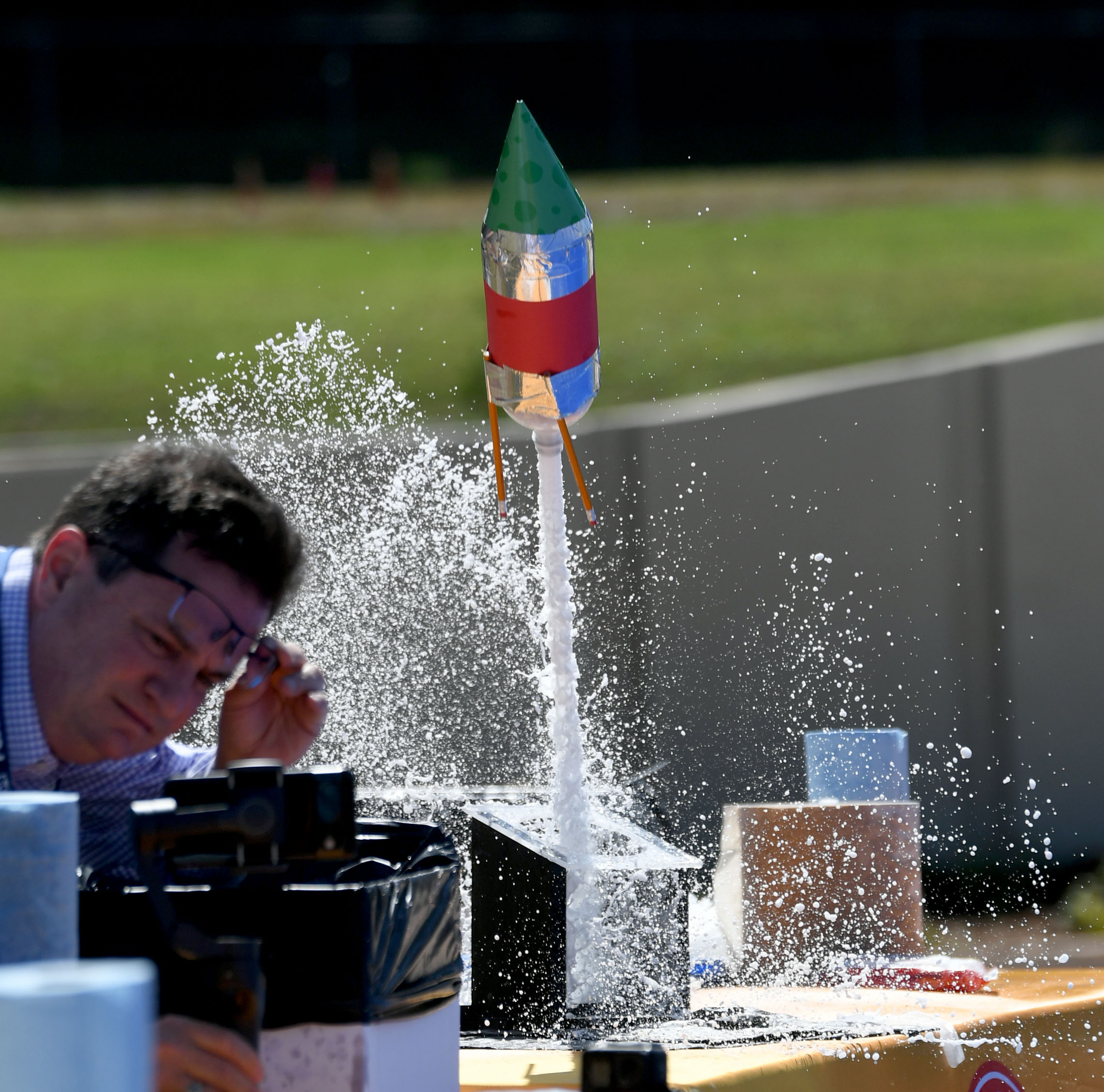
A student-built rocket made of basic materials takes off. The product of the sodium bicarbonate reaction is ejected out the bottom, propelling the rocket upwards.

A sodium bicarbonate rocket (sometimes called an Alka-Seltzer rocket) is a model rocket fashioned from a 35mm film canister and propelled by the pressure of a gas, often carbon dioxide, generated from the reaction of an acid with sodium bicarbonate. Sodium bicarbonate rockets are often used in science classes to demonstrate principles of chemistry and physics.

In the experiment, a film canister is filled with water, an effervescent tablet (commonly Alka-Seltzer) is added and the canister tightly sealed. After a short time, the pressure of the carbon dioxide is great enough to cause the body of the canister to be launched into the air with a popping sound. The canister may be embellished with paper fins to resemble more closely a real rocket.

Various experiments and lessons can center around the use of a bicarbonate rocket. For example, students are sometimes asked to experiment with the amounts of water and Alka-Seltzer to find the combination which propels the rocket the greatest distance. Alternatively they may derive equations to calculate the speed and velocity of the rocket from the distance it travels.

In rocketry, a chemical reaction rapidly creates gas that is expelled in one direction from its container (the rocket engine); momentum forces the rocket in the opposite direction. The alka-seltzer rocket experiment demonstrates Newton's third law. The film canister rocket has a buildup of gas that wants to come out of the weakest spot making all the gas come out at once through the hole at the bottom. The gas comes out from the underside and pushes the rocket up. After it gets pushed up, air resistance slows it down and gravity pulls it down to earth. The film canister accelerates quickly because it has very little mass. The film canister rocket uses a solid fuel mixed with a liquid fuel to create a gas that escapes out of the bottom. The gas is carbon dioxide (CO_{2}), the liquid is water (H_{2}O), and the solid is an effervescent tablet. When the H_{2}O is mixed with an effervescent tablet, it produces the gas CO_{2}. The reaction time depends on the surface area of the tablet.

== See also ==
- Water rocket
- Diet Coke and Mentos eruption
