= Cooling bath =

Liquid mixture used to maintain low temperatures

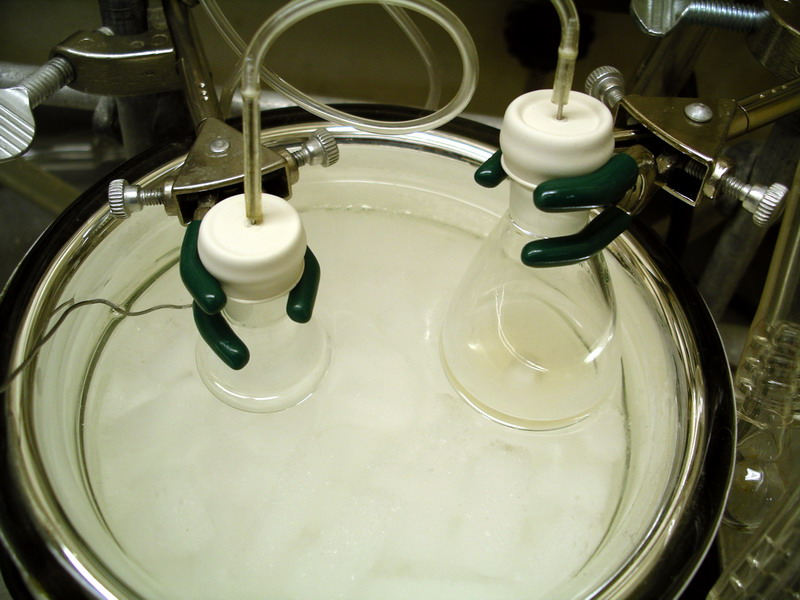
A typical experimental setup for an aldol reaction. Both flasks are submerged in a dry ice/acetone cooling bath (−78 °C) the temperature of which is being monitored by a thermocouple (the wire on the left).

A cooling bath or ice bath, in laboratory chemistry practice, is a liquid mixture which is used to maintain low temperatures, typically between 13 °C and −196 °C. These low temperatures are used to collect liquids after distillation, to remove solvents using a rotary evaporator, or to perform a chemical reaction below room temperature (see Kinetic control).

Cooling baths are generally one of two types: (a) a cold fluid (particularly liquid nitrogen, water, or even air) — but most commonly the term refers to (b) a mixture of 3 components: (1) a cooling agent (such as dry ice or ice); (2) a liquid "carrier" (such as liquid water, ethylene glycol, acetone, etc.), which transfers heat between the bath and the vessel; (3) an additive to depress the melting point of the solid/liquid system.

A familiar example of this is the use of an ice/rock-salt mixture to freeze ice cream. Adding salt lowers the freezing temperature of water, lowering the minimum temperature attainable with only ice.

Mixed solvent cooling baths (% by volume)
% Glycol in EtOH	Temp (°C)	% H_{2}O in MeOH	Temp (°C)
0%	−78	0%	−97.6
10%	−76	14%	−128
20%	−72	20%	N/A
30%	−66	30%	−72
40%	−60	40%	−64
50%	−52	50%	−47
60%	−41	60%	−36
70%	−32	70%	−20
80%	−28	80%	−12.5
90%	−21	90%	−5.5
100%	−17	100%	0

== Mixed-solvent cooling baths ==
Mixing solvents creates cooling baths with variable freezing points. Temperatures between approximately −78 °C and −17 °C can be maintained by placing coolant into a mixture of ethylene glycol and ethanol, while mixtures of methanol and water span the −128 °C to 0 °C temperature range. Dry ice sublimes at −78 °C, while liquid nitrogen is used for colder baths.

As water or ethylene glycol freeze out of the mixture, the concentration of ethanol/methanol increases. This leads to a new, lower freezing point. With dry ice, these baths will never freeze solid, as pure methanol and ethanol both freeze below −78 °C (−98 °C and −114 °C respectively).

Relative to traditional cooling baths, solvent mixtures are adaptable for a wide temperature range. In addition, the solvents necessary are cheaper and less toxic than those used in traditional baths.

== Traditional cooling baths ==
Traditional cooling bath mixtures
Cooling agent	Organic solvent or salt	Temp (°C)
Dry ice	p-xylene	+13
Dry ice	Dioxane	+12
Dry ice	Cyclohexane	+6
Dry ice	Benzene	+5
Dry ice	Formamide	+2
Ice	Salts (see: left)	0 to −40
Liquid N_{2}	Cycloheptane	−12
Dry ice	Benzyl alcohol	−15
Dry ice	Tetrachloroethylene	−22
Dry ice	Carbon tetrachloride	−23
Dry ice	1,3-Dichlorobenzene	−25
Dry ice	o-Xylene	−29
Dry ice	m-Toluidine	−32
Dry ice	Acetonitrile	−41
Dry ice	Pyridine	−42
Dry ice	m-Xylene	−47
Dry ice	n-Octane	−56
Dry ice	Isopropyl ether	−60
Dry ice	Acetone	−78
Liquid N_{2}	Ethyl acetate	−84
Liquid N_{2}	n-Butanol	−89
Liquid N_{2}	Hexane	−94
Liquid N_{2}	Acetone	−94
Liquid N_{2}	Toluene	−95
Liquid N_{2}	Methanol	−98
Liquid N_{2}	Cyclohexene	−104
Liquid N_{2}	Ethanol	−116
Liquid N_{2}	n-Pentane	−131
Liquid N_{2}	Isopentane	−160
Liquid N_{2}	(none)	−196

=== Water and ice baths ===
A bath of ice and water will maintain a temperature 0 °C, since the melting point of water is 0 °C. However, adding a salt such as sodium chloride will lower the temperature through the property of freezing-point depression. Although the exact temperature can be hard to control, the weight ratio of salt to ice influences the temperature:

- −10 °C can be achieved with a 1:2.5 mass ratio of calcium chloride hemihydrate to ice.
- −20 °C can be achieved with a 1:3 mass ratio of sodium chloride to ice.

=== Dry ice baths at −78 °C ===
Since dry ice will sublime at −78 °C, a mixture such as acetone/dry ice will maintain −78 °C. Also, the solution will not freeze because acetone requires a temperature of about −93 °C to begin freezing.

=== Safety recommendations ===
The American Chemical Society notes that the ideal organic solvents to use in a cooling bath have the following characteristics:

1. Nontoxic vapors.
2. Low viscosity.
3. Nonflammability.
4. Low volatility.
5. Suitable freezing point.

In some cases, a simple substitution can give nearly identical results while lowering risks. For example, using dry ice in 2-propanol rather than acetone yields a nearly identical temperature but avoids the volatility of acetone (see § Further reading below).

== See also ==
- List of cooling baths
- Pumpable ice technology
