= List of UN numbers 1801 to 1900 =

UN numbers from UN1801 to UN1900 as assigned by the United Nations Committee of Experts on the Transport of Dangerous Goods are as follows:

== UN 1801 to UN 1900 ==
| UN Number | Class | Proper Shipping Name |
|---|---|---|
| UN 1801 | 8 | Octyltrichlorosilane |
| UN 1802 | 8 | Perchloric acid with not more than 50 percent acid by mass |
| UN 1803 | 8 | Phenolsulfonic acid, liquid |
| UN 1804 | 8 | Phenyltrichlorosilane |
| UN 1805 | 8 | Phosphoric acid |
| UN 1806 | 8 | Phosphorus pentachloride |
| UN 1807 | 8 | Phosphorus pentoxide |
| UN 1808 | 8 | Phosphorus tribromide |
| UN 1809 | 6.1 | Phosphorus trichloride |
| UN 1810 | 8 | Phosphorus oxychloride |
| UN 1811 | 8 | Potassium hydrogendifluoride, solid or Potassium hydrogendifluoride, solution |
| UN 1812 | 8 | Potassium fluoride |
| UN 1813 | 8 | Potassium hydroxide, solid |
| UN 1814 | 8 | Potassium hydroxide, solution |
| UN 1815 | 3 | Propionyl chloride |
| UN 1816 | 8 | Propyltrichlorosilane |
| UN 1817 | 8 | Pyrosulfuryl chloride |
| UN 1818 | 8 | Silicon tetrachloride |
| UN 1819 | 8 | Sodium aluminate, solution |
| UN 1820 | ? | (UN No. no longer in use) |
| UN 1821 | ? | (UN No. no longer in use) Sodium hydrogen sulfate, solid (UN No. no longer in use) |
| UN 1822 | ? | (UN No. no longer in use) |
| UN 1823 | 8 | Sodium hydroxide, solid |
| UN 1824 | 8 | Sodium hydroxide solution |
| UN 1825 | 8 | Sodium monoxide |
| UN 1826 | 8 | Nitrating acid mixtures, spent with more than 50 percent nitric acid or Nitrating acid mixtures, spent with not more than 50 percent nitric acid |
| UN 1827 | 8 | Stannic chloride, anhydrous |
| UN 1828 | 8 | Sulfur chlorides |
| UN 1829 | 8 | Sulfur trioxide, inhibited or Sulfur trioxide, stabilized |
| UN 1830 | 8 | Sulfuric acid with more than 51 percent acid |
| UN 1831 | 8 | Sulfuric acid, fuming with 30 percent or more free sulfur trioxide or Sulfuric acid, fuming with less than 30 percent free sulfur trioxide |
| UN 1832 | 8 | Sulfuric acid, spent |
| UN 1833 | 8 | Sulfurous acid |
| UN 1834 | 8 | Sulfuryl chloride |
| UN 1835 | 8 | Tetramethylammonium hydroxide |
| UN 1836 | 8 | Thionyl chloride |
| UN 1837 | 8 | Thiophosphoryl chloride |
| UN 1838 | 8 | Titanium tetrachloride |
| UN 1839 | 8 | Trichloroacetic acid |
| UN 1840 | 8 | Zinc chloride, solution |
| UN 1841 | 9 | Acetaldehyde ammonia |
| UN 1842 | ? | (UN No. no longer in use) Acetic acid (UN No. no longer in use) |
| UN 1843 | 6.1 | Ammonium dinitro-o-cresolate |
| UN 1844 | ? | (UN No. no longer in use) |
| UN 1845 | 9 | Carbon dioxide, solid, also called Dry ice |
| UN 1846 | 8 | Carbon tetrachloride |
| UN 1847 | 8 | Potassium sulfide, hydrated with not less than 30 percent water of crystallization |
| UN 1848 | 8 | Propionic acid |
| UN 1849 | 6.1 | Sodium sulfide, hydrated with not less than 30 percent water |
| UN 1850 | ? | (UN No. no longer in use) Eradicator, paint, liquid or Eradicator, grease, liquid (UN No. no longer in use) |
| UN 1851 | 6.1 | Medicine, liquid, toxic, n.o.s. |
| UN 1852 to 1853 | ? | (UN No. no longer in use) |
| UN 1854 | 4.2 | Barium alloys, pyrophoric |
| UN 1855 | 4.2 | Calcium, pyrophoric or Calcium alloys, pyrophoric |
| UN 1856 | 4.2 | Rags, oily |
| UN 1857 | 4.2 | Textile waste, wet |
| UN 1858 | 2 | Hexafluoropropylene, compressed or Refrigerant gas R 1216 |
| UN 1859 | 2 | Silicon tetrafluoride, compressed |
| UN 1860 | 3 | Vinyl fluoride, inhibited |
| UN 1861 | ? | (UN No. no longer in use) |
| UN 1862 | 3 | Ethyl crotonate |
| UN 1863 | 3 | Fuel, aviation, turbine engine |
| UN 1864 | ? | (UN No. no longer in use) Gas drips or Gas drips, hydrocarbon (UN No. no longer in use) |
| UN 1865 | 3 | n-Propyl nitrate |
| UN 1866 | 3 | Resin solution, flammable |
| UN 1867 | ? | (UN No. no longer in use) Cigarettes or Self-lighting cigarettes (UN No. no longer in use) |
| UN 1868 | 4.1 | Decaborane |
| UN 1869 | 4.3 | Magnesium or Magnesium alloys with more than 50 percent magnesium in pellets, turnings, or ribbons |
| UN 1870 | 4.1 | Potassium borohydride |
| UN 1871 | 5.1 | Titanium hydride |
| UN 1872 | 5.1 | Lead dioxide |
| UN 1873 | 5.1 | Perchloric acid with more than 50 percent but not more than 72 percent acid, by mass |
| UN 1874 to 1883 | ? | (UN No.s no longer in use) |
| UN 1884 | 6.1 | Barium oxide |
| UN 1885 | 6.1 | Benzidine |
| UN 1886 | 6.1 | Benzylidene chloride |
| UN 1887 | 6.1 | Bromochloromethane |
| UN 1888 | 6.1 | Chloroform |
| UN 1889 | 6.1 | Cyanogen bromide |
| UN 1890 | ? | (UN No. no longer in use) |
| UN 1891 | 6.1 | Ethyl bromide |
| UN 1892 | 6.1 | Ethyldichloroarsine |
| UN 1893 | ? | (UN No. no longer in use) |
| UN 1894 | 6.1 | Phenylmercuric hydroxide |
| UN 1895 | 6.1 | Phenylmercuric nitrate |
| UN 1896 | ? | (UN No. no longer in use) Resin solution, toxic (UN No. no longer in use) |
| UN 1897 | 6.1 | Tetrachloroethylene |
| UN 1898 | 8 | Acetyl iodide |
| UN 1899 to 1900 | ? | (UN No.s no longer in use) |

n.o.s. = not otherwise specified meaning a collective entry to which substances, mixtures, solutions or articles may be assigned if a) they are not mentioned by name in 3.2 Dangerous Goods List AND b) they exhibit chemical, physical and/or dangerous properties corresponding to the Class, classification code, packing group and the name and description of the n.o.s. entry

== See also ==
- Lists of UN numbers
