= Dry ice =

Solid form of carbon dioxide

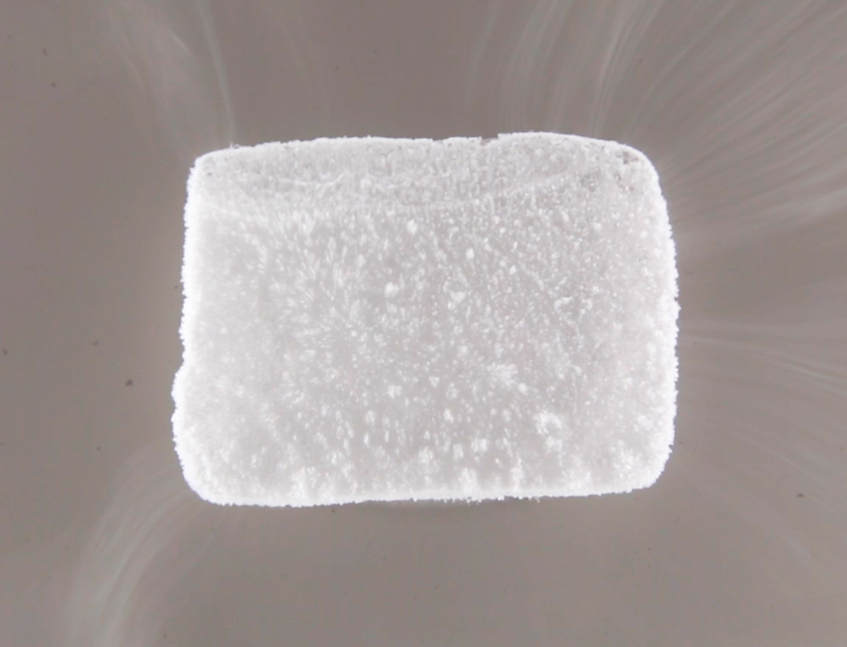
Subliming dry ice pellet, with white frost on the surface

Dry ice is the solid form of carbon dioxide. It is commonly used for temporary refrigeration as CO_{2} does not have a liquid state at normal atmospheric pressure and sublimes directly from the solid state to the gas state. It is used primarily as a cooling agent, but is also used in fog machines at theatres for dramatic effects. Its advantages include lower temperature than that of water ice and not leaving any residue (other than incidental frost from moisture in the atmosphere). It is useful for preserving frozen foods (such as ice cream) where mechanical cooling is unavailable.

Dry ice sublimes at 194.7 K (−78.5 °C; −109.2 °F) at Earth atmospheric pressure. This extreme cold makes the solid dangerous to handle without protection from frostbite injury. While carbon dioxide is not toxic at normal atmospheric concentrations, dry ice can create dangerous CO₂ levels in poorly ventilated spaces. The outgassing from it can cause hypercapnia (abnormally elevated carbon dioxide levels in the blood) due to a buildup in confined locations.

== Properties ==
Comparison of phase diagrams of carbon dioxide (red) and water (blue) as a log-lin chart with phase transitions points at 1 atmosphere pressure

Dry ice is the solid form of carbon dioxide (CO_{2}), a molecule consisting of a single carbon atom bonded to two oxygen atoms. Dry ice is colorless, odorless, and non-flammable, and can lower the pH of a solution when dissolved in water, forming carbonic acid (H_{2}CO_{3}).

At pressures below 5.13 atm and temperatures below −56.4 °C (216.8 K; −69.5 °F) (the triple point), CO_{2} changes from a solid to a gas with no intervening liquid form, through a process called sublimation. (Note: Above the triple point, CO_{2} goes through the more familiar transitions via a liquid phase.) The opposite process is called deposition, where CO_{2} changes from the gas to solid phase (dry ice). At atmospheric pressure, sublimation/deposition occurs at 194.7 K (−78.5 °C; −109.2 °F).

The density of dry ice increases with decreasing temperature and ranges between about 1.55 and 1.7 g/cm^{3} (97 and 106 lb/cu ft) below 195 K (−78 °C; −109 °F). The low temperature and direct sublimation to a gas makes dry ice an effective coolant, since it is colder than water ice and leaves no residue as it changes state. Its enthalpy of sublimation is 571 kJ/kg (25.2 kJ/mol, 136.5 calorie/g).

Dry ice is non-polar, with a dipole moment of zero, so attractive intermolecular van der Waals forces operate. The composition results in low thermal and electrical conductivity.

== History ==
It is generally accepted that dry ice was first observed in 1835 by French inventor Adrien-Jean-Pierre Thilorier (1790–1844), who published the first account of the substance. In his experiments, he noted that when opening the lid of a large cylinder containing liquid carbon dioxide, most of the liquid carbon dioxide quickly evaporated. This left only solid dry ice in the container. In 1924, Thomas B. Slate applied for a US patent to sell dry ice commercially. Subsequently, he became the first to make dry ice successful as an industry. In 1925, this solid form of CO_{2} was trademarked by the DryIce Corporation of America as "Dry ice", leading to its common name. That same year the DryIce Co. sold the substance commercially for the first time, marketing it for refrigeration purposes.

== Manufacture ==
Sublimation of dry ice when placed on water at room temperature

Dry ice is produced industrially through the compression and cooling of carbon dioxide. The most common industrial method of manufacturing dry ice starts with a gas having a high concentration of carbon dioxide. Such gases can be a byproduct of another process, such as producing ammonia from nitrogen and natural gas, oil refinery activities or large-scale fermentation. The carbon dioxide-rich gas is then pressurized and refrigerated until it liquefies. Next, the pressure is reduced. When this occurs some liquid carbon dioxide vaporizes, causing a rapid lowering of temperature of the remaining liquid. As a result, the extreme cold causes the liquid to solidify into a snow-like consistency. Finally, the snow-like solid carbon dioxide is compressed into small pellets or larger blocks of dry ice.

Dry ice is typically produced in three standard forms: large blocks, small (1/2 or 5/8 in [13 or 16 mm] diameter) cylindrical pellets and tiny (1/8 inch [3.2 mm] diameter) cylindrical, high surface to volume pellets that float on oil or water and do not stick to skin because of their high radii of curvature. Tiny dry ice pellets are used primarily for dry ice blasting, quick freezing, fire fighting, oil solidifying and have been found to be safe for experimentation by middle school students wearing appropriate personal protective equipment such as gloves and safety glasses. A standard block weighing approximately 30 kg (66 lb) covered in a taped paper wrapping is most common. These are commonly used in shipping, because they sublime relatively slowly due to a low ratio of surface area to volume. Pellets are around 1 cm (0.4 in) in diameter and can be bagged easily. This form is suited to small scale use, for example at grocery stores and laboratories where it is stored in a thickly insulated chest. Density of pellets is 60–70% of the density of blocks.

Dry ice is also produced as a byproduct of cryogenic air separation, an industry primarily concerned with manufacturing extremely cold liquids such as liquid nitrogen and liquid oxygen. In this process, carbon dioxide liquefies or freezes at a far higher temperature compared to that needed to liquefy nitrogen and oxygen. The carbon dioxide must be removed during the process to prevent dry ice from fouling the equipment, and once separated can be processed into commercial dry ice in a manner similar to that described above.

== Applications ==
=== Commercial ===
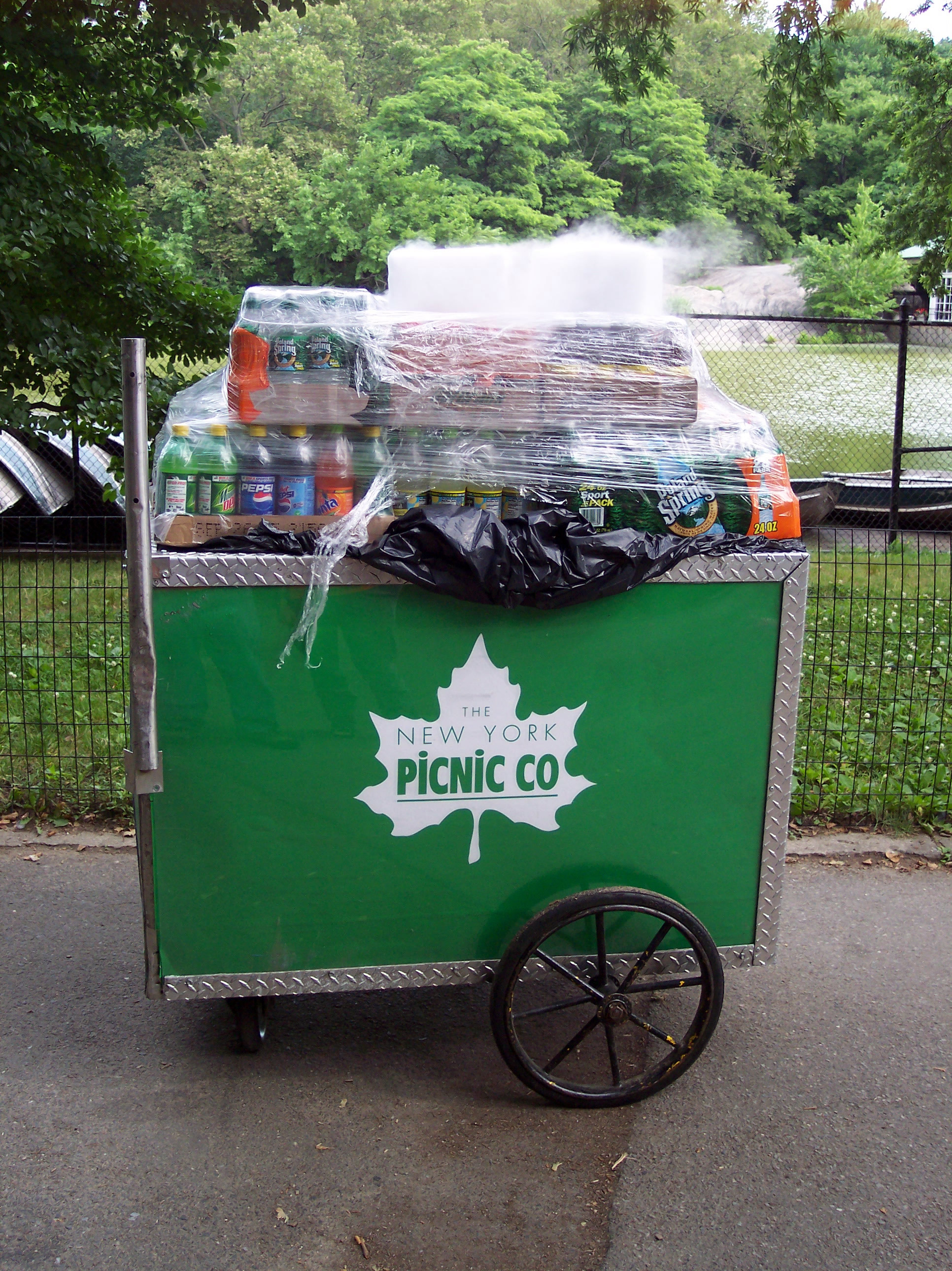
Dry ice being used to cool beverages in Central Park, New York

The most common use of dry ice is to preserve food, using non-cyclic refrigeration.

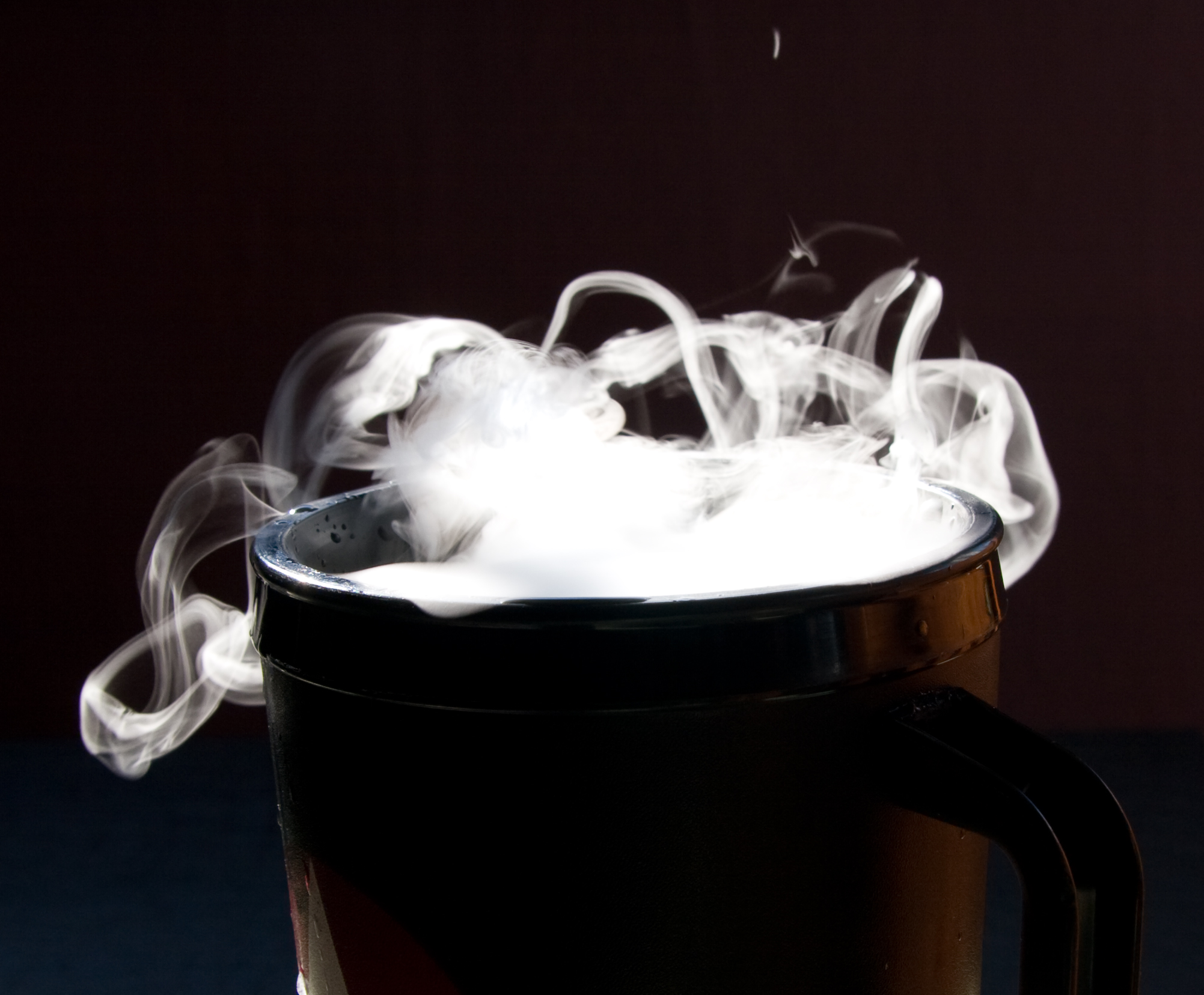
Sublimation

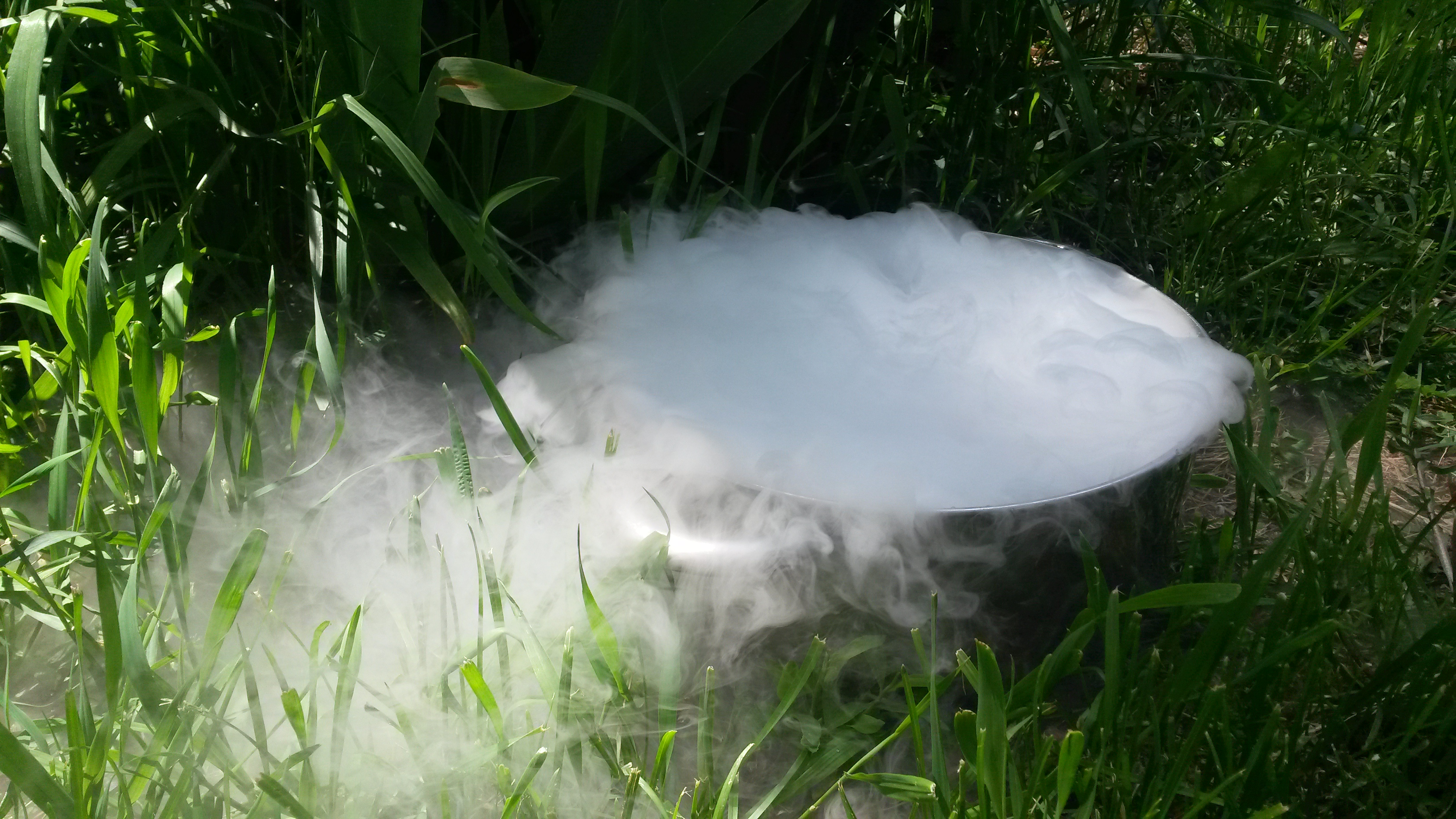
Dry ice in water

It is frequently used to package items that must remain cold or frozen, such as ice cream or biological samples, in the absence of availability or practicality of mechanical cooling.

Dry ice is widely used in pharmaceutical cold-chain logistics, including the transportation of vaccines, biological samples, and temperature-sensitive medical products, which require storage at ultra-cold temperatures along their supply line.

Dry ice can be used to flash-freeze food or laboratory biological samples, carbonate beverages, make ice cream, solidify oil spills and stop ice sculptures and ice walls from melting.

Dry ice can be used to arrest and prevent insect activity in closed containers of grains and grain products, as it displaces oxygen, but does not alter the taste or quality of foods. For the same reason, it can prevent or retard food oils and fats from becoming rancid.

When dry ice is placed in water, sublimation is accelerated, and low-sinking, dense clouds of smoke-like fog are created. This is used in fog machines, at theatres, haunted house attractions, and nightclubs for dramatic effects. Unlike most artificial fog machines, in which fog rises like smoke, fog from dry ice hovers near the ground. Dry ice is useful in theatre productions that require dense fog effects. The fog originates from the bulk water into which the dry ice is placed, and not from atmospheric water vapor (as is commonly assumed).

It is occasionally used to freeze and remove warts. However, liquid nitrogen performs better in this role, as it is colder, thereby requiring less time to act, and needs less pressure to store. Dry ice has fewer problems with storage, since it can be generated from compressed carbon dioxide gas as needed.

In plumbing, dry ice is used to cut off water flow to pipes to allow repairs to be made without shutting off water mains. Pressurised liquid CO_{2} is forced into a jacket wrapped around a pipe, which in turn causes the water inside to freeze and block the pipe. When the repairs are done, the jacket is removed and the ice plug melts, allowing the flow to resume. This technique can be used on pipes up to 4 inches or 100 mm in diameter.

Dry ice can be used as bait to trap mosquitoes, bedbugs, and other insects, due to their attraction to carbon dioxide.

It can be used to exterminate rodents. This is done by dropping pellets into rodent tunnels in the ground and then sealing off the entrance, thus suffocating the animals as the dry ice sublimates.

Tiny dry ice pellets can be used to fight fire by both cooling fuel and suffocating the fire by excluding oxygen.

The extreme temperature of dry ice can cause viscoelastic materials to change to glass phase. Thus, it is useful for removing many types of pressure sensitive adhesives.

=== Industrial ===
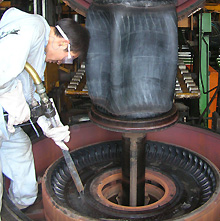
Dry ice blasting used for cleaning a rubber mold

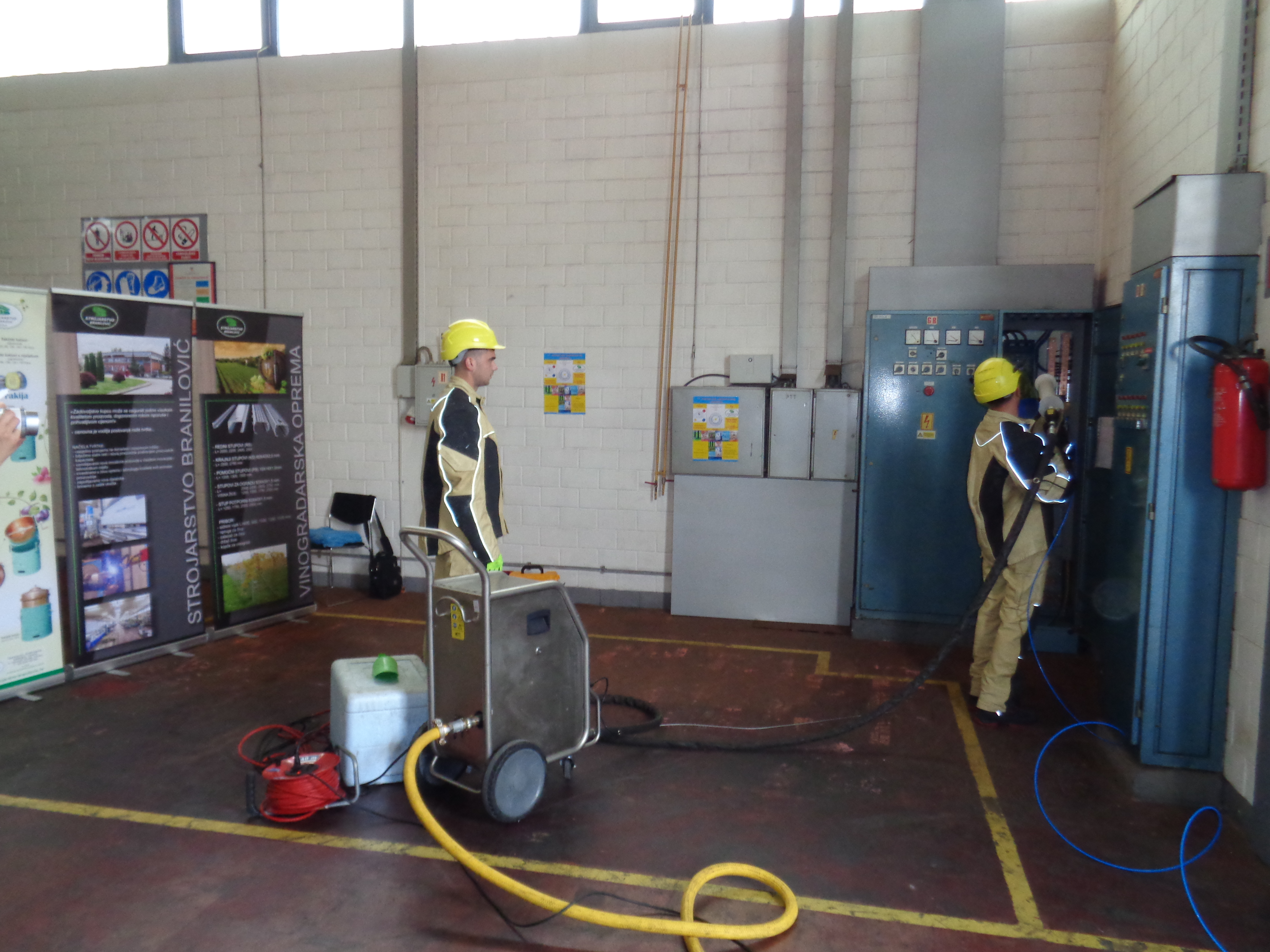
Dry ice blasting used for cleaning electrical installations

Dry ice can be used for loosening asphalt floor tiles or car sound deadening material, making them easy to prise off, as well as freezing water in valveless pipes to enable repair.

One of the largest mechanical uses of dry ice is blast cleaning. Dry ice pellets are shot from a nozzle with compressed air, combining the power of the speed of the pellets with the action of the sublimation. This can remove residues from industrial equipment. Examples of materials removed include ink, glue, oil, paint, mold and rubber. Dry ice blasting can replace sandblasting, steam blasting, water blasting or solvent blasting. The primary environmental residue of dry ice blasting is the sublimed CO_{2}, thus making it a useful technique where residues from other blasting techniques are undesirable. Recently, blast cleaning has been introduced as a method of removing smoke damage from structures after fires.

Dry ice is also useful for the de-gassing of flammable vapours from storage tanks –the sublimation of dry ice pellets inside an emptied and vented tank causes an outrush of CO_{2} that carries with it the flammable vapours.

The removal and fitting of cylinder liners in large engines requires the use of dry ice to chill and thus shrink the liner so that it freely slides into the engine block. When the liner then warms up, it expands, and the resulting interference fit holds it tightly in place. Similar procedures may be used in fabricating mechanical assemblies with a high resultant strength, replacing the need for pins, keys or welds.

Dry ice has found its application in construction for freezing soil, serving as an effective alternative to liquid nitrogen. This method reduces the soil temperature to approximately -70 to -74 °C, rapidly freezing the groundwater. As a result, the soil's strength and impermeability significantly increase, which is essential for the safe execution of underground construction projects.

It is also useful as a cutting fluid.

=== Scientific ===
In laboratories, a slurry of dry ice in an organic solvent is a useful freezing mixture for cold chemical reactions and for condensing solvents in rotary evaporators. Dry ice and acetone forms a cold bath of −78 °C (−108 °F; 195 K), which can be used for instance to prevent thermal runaway in a Swern oxidation.

The process of altering cloud precipitation can be done with the use of dry ice. It was widely used in experiments in the US in the 1950s and early 1960s before it was replaced by silver iodide. Dry ice has the advantage of being relatively cheap and completely non-toxic. Its main drawback is the need to be delivered directly into the supercooled region of clouds being seeded.

=== Dry ice bombs ===
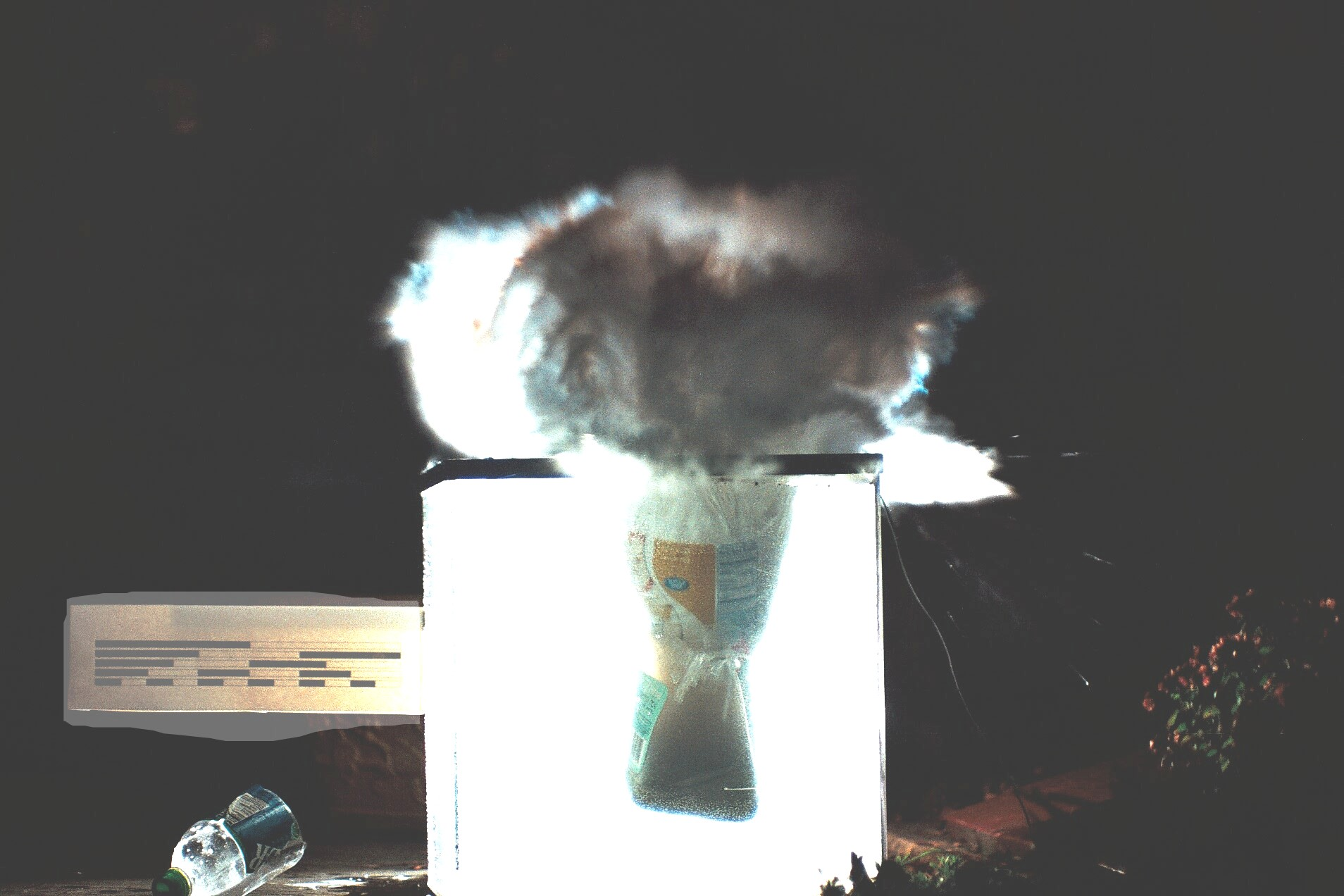
Dry ice bomb

A "dry ice bomb" is a balloon-like device using dry ice in a sealed container such as a plastic bottle. Water is usually added to accelerate the sublimation of the dry ice. As the dry ice sublimes, pressure increases, causing the bottle to burst with a loud noise. The screw cap can be replaced with a rubber stopper to make a water rocket.

The dry ice bomb device was featured on MythBusters, episode 57 Mentos and Soda, which first aired on August 9, 2006. It was also featured in an episode of Time Warp, as well as in an episode of Archer.

== Extraterrestrial occurrence ==
Following the Mars flyby of the Mariner 4 spacecraft in 1966, scientists concluded that Mars' polar caps consist entirely of dry ice. However, findings made in 2003 by researchers at the California Institute of Technology have shown that Mars' polar caps are almost completely made of water ice, and that dry ice only forms a thin surface layer that thickens and thins seasonally. A phenomenon named dry ice storms was proposed to occur over the polar regions of Mars. They are comparable to Earth's thunderstorms, with crystalline CO_{2} taking the place of water in the clouds. Dry ice is also proposed as a mechanism for the geysers on Mars.

In 2012, the European Space Agency's Venus Express probe detected a cold layer in the atmosphere of Venus where temperatures are close to the triple point of carbon dioxide –hence it is possible that flakes of dry ice precipitate.

Observations from the Uranus flyby by Voyager 2 indicates that dry ice is present on the surface of its large moons Ariel, Umbriel and Titania. Scientists speculate that the magnetic field of Uranus contributes to the generation of CO_{2} ice on the surfaces of its moons. Voyager 2 observations of Neptune's moon Triton suggested the presence of dry ice on the surface, though followup observations indicate that the carbon ices on the surface are carbon monoxide but that the moon's crust is composed of a significant quantity of dry ice.

== Safety ==
Dry ice
Structure
Crystal structure	cubic
Space group	Pa3̅
Lattice constant	a = 5.63 Å
Formula units (Z)	4

Hazards
- GHS labelling
Pictograms	(GHS04: Compressed Gas)
Signal word	Warning
Hazard statements	H280
Precautionary statements	P403

Prolonged exposure to dry ice can cause severe skin damage through frostbite, and the fog produced may also hinder attempts to withdraw from contact in a safe manner. Because it sublimes into large quantities of carbon dioxide gas, which could pose a danger of hypercapnia, dry ice should only be exposed to open air in a well-ventilated environment. For this reason, in the context of laboratory safety dry ice is assigned label precaution P403: "Store in a well-ventilated place." Industrial dry ice may contain contaminants that make it unsafe for direct contact with food. Tiny dry ice pellets used in dry ice blast cleaning do not contain oily residues.

Dry ice is assigned a UN number, a code for hazardous substances: UN 1845. Dry ice is not classified as a dangerous substance by the European Union, or as a hazardous material by the United States Department of Transportation for ground transportation. However, in the US, it is regulated as a dangerous good when shipped by air or water. International Air Transport Association (IATA) regulations require specific diamond-shaped black-and white labelling to be placed on the package. The package must have adequate ventilation so that it will not rupture from pressure in the event that the Dry Ice begins to sublime in the packaging. The Federal Aviation Administration in the US allows airline passengers to carry up to 2.5 kg (5.5 lb) per person either as checked baggage or carry-on baggage, when used to refrigerate perishables.

At least one person has been killed by carbon dioxide gas subliming off dry ice in coolers placed in a car. In 2020, three people were killed at a party in Moscow after 25 kg of dry ice was dumped in a pool; carbon dioxide is heavier than air, and so can linger near the ground, just above water level.

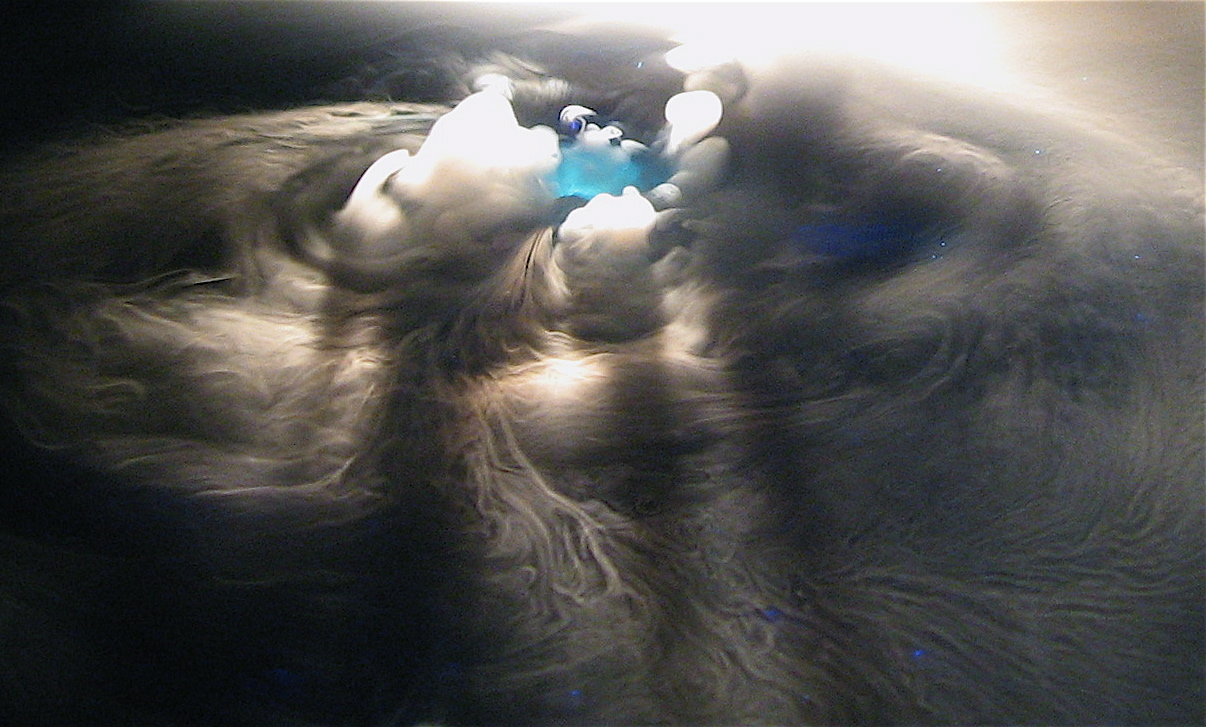
Dry ice pellet subliming in water, releasing thick white fog

A UN 1845 label for dry ice

=== Drink ===
Dry ice is sometimes used to give a fog effect to cocktails. One bar patron who accidentally ingested pellets from a drink suffered severe burns to his esophagus, stomach, and duodenum, causing permanent problems with eating. Rapid sublimation could cause gas buildup that ruptures digestive organs or suffocation. Products that contain dry ice and prevent it from being accidentally ingested eliminate these risks while producing the desired fog effect.

== General bibliography ==
- Duane, H. D. Roller; Thilorier, M. (1952). "Thilyorier and the First Solidification of a "Permanent" Gas (1835)". Isis. 43 (2): 109–113. doi:10.1086/349402. JSTOR 227174. S2CID 144091865.
- Goroll, Allan H; Mulley, Albert G (2009). Primary Care Medicine: Office evaluation and management of the adult patient. Lippincott Williams & Wilkins. ISBN 978-0-7817-7513-7.
- Häring, Heinz-Wolfgang (2008). Industrial Gases Processing. Christine Ahner. Wiley-VCH. ISBN 978-3-527-31685-4.
- Housecroft, Catherine; Sharpe, Alan G (2001). Inorganic chemistry. Harlow: Prentice Hall. p. 410. ISBN 978-0-582-31080-3.
- Keyes, Conrad G (2006). Guidelines for Cloud Seeding to Augment Precipitation. American Society of Civil Engineers. ASCE Publications. ISBN 978-0-7844-0819-3.
- Verma, N. K.; Khanna, S. K.; Kapila, B. (2008). Comprehensive Chemistry for Class XI. New Delhi: Laxmi Publications. ISBN 978-81-7008-596-6.
- McCarthy, Robert E. (1992). Secrets of Hollywood Special Effects. Boston: Focal Press. ISBN 978-0-240-80108-7.
- Mitra, Somenath (April 2004). Sample Preparation Techniques in Analytical Chemistry. Wiley-IEEE. ISBN 978-0-471-32845-2.
- Treloar, Roy D. (2003). Plumbing Encyclopaedia (3rd ed.). Wiley-Blackwell. p. 175. ISBN 978-1-4051-0613-9.
- Yaws, Carl (2001). Matheson Gas Data Book (7th ed.). McGraw-Hill Professional. ISBN 978-0-07-135854-5. 982 pages.
