= Water rocket =

Type of model rocket using water as its reaction mass

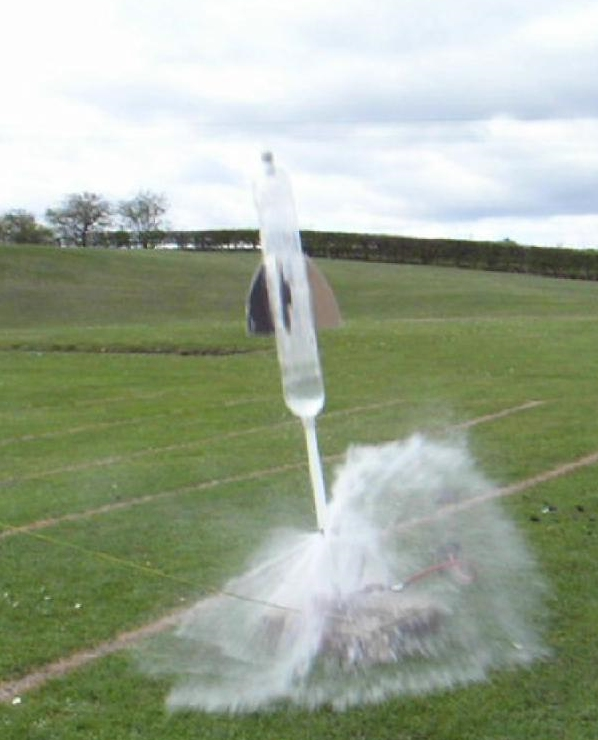
Water rocket launch

A water rocket is a type of model rocket using water as its reaction mass. The water is forced out by a pressurized gas, typically compressed air. Like all rocket engines, it operates on the principle of Newton's third law of motion. Water rocket hobbyists typically use one or more plastic soft drink bottles as the rocket's pressure vessel. A variety of designs are possible including multi-stage rockets. Water rockets are also custom-built from composite materials to achieve world record altitudes.

== Operation ==
Simplified animation of how a water rocket works. 1) A bubble of compressed air is added and pressurizes the contents of the bottle. 2) The bottle is released from the pump. 3) The water is pushed out through the nozzle by the compressed air. 4) The bottle moves away from the water because it follows Newton's third law.

The bottle is partly filled with water and sealed. The bottle is then pressurized with a gas, usually air compressed from a bicycle pump, air compressor, or cylinder up to 125 psi, but sometimes CO_{2} or nitrogen from a cylinder are used.

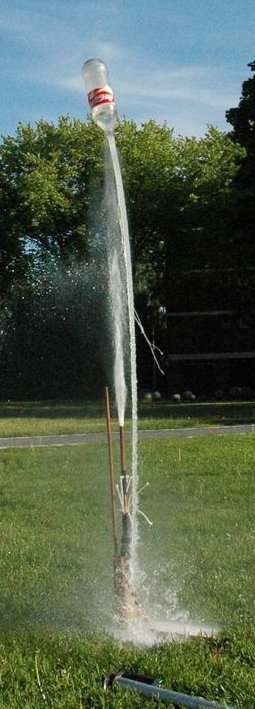
Launch of a bottle without nose cone or fins.

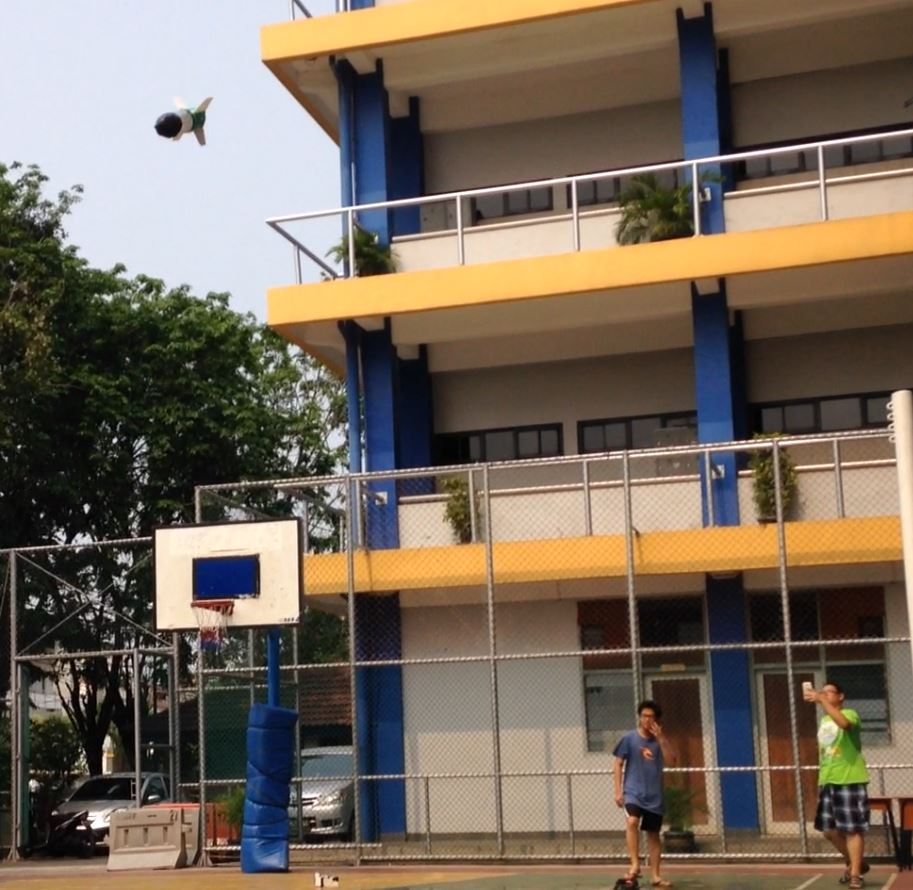
Launching a water rocket. The rocket is in its peak with no water inside it.

Water and gas are used in combination, with the gas providing a means to store energy, as it is compressible, and the water increasing the propellant mass fraction and providing greater force when ejected from the rocket's nozzle. Sometimes additives are combined with the water to enhance performance in different ways. For example: salt can be added to increase the density of the reaction mass, resulting in a higher delta-v. Soap is also sometimes used to create a dense foam in the rocket which lowers the density of the expelled reaction mass but increases the duration of thrust.

The seal on the nozzle of the rocket is then released and rapid expulsion of water occurs at high speeds until the propellant has been used up and the air pressure inside the rocket drops to atmospheric pressure. There is a net force created on the rocket in accordance with Newton's third law. The expulsion of the water thus can cause the rocket to leap a considerable distance into the air.

In addition to aerodynamic considerations, altitude and flight duration are dependent upon the volume of water, the initial pressure, the rocket nozzle's size, and the unloaded weight of the rocket. The relationship between these factors is complex and several simulators have been written to explore these and other factors.

Full HD 40 times slow motion video of water rocket liftoff

Often the pressure vessel is built from one or more used plastic soft drink bottles, but polycarbonate fluorescent tube covers, plastic pipes, and other light-weight pressure-resistant cylindrical vessels have also been used.

Image sequence from a high speed video showing liftoff

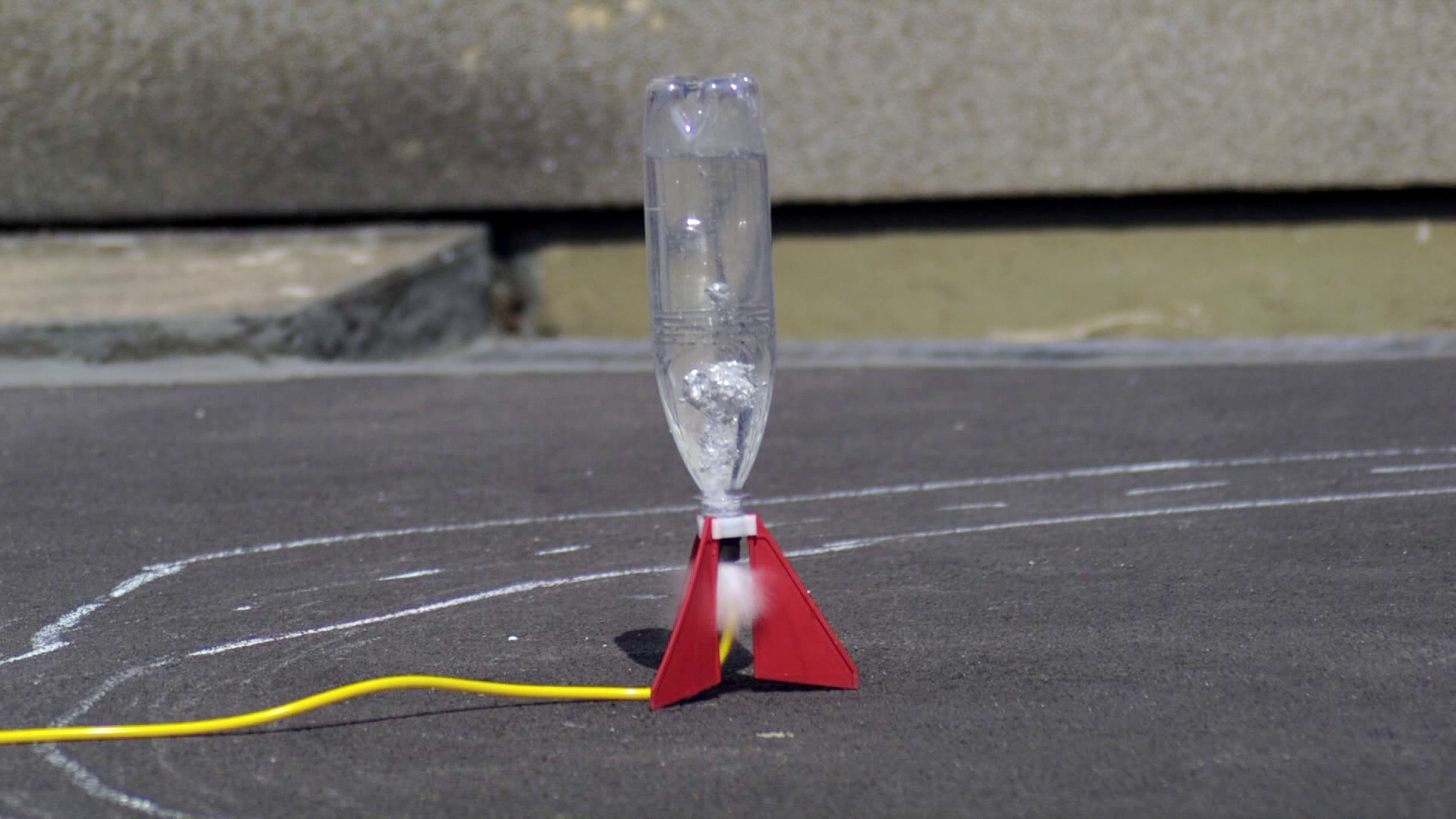
1

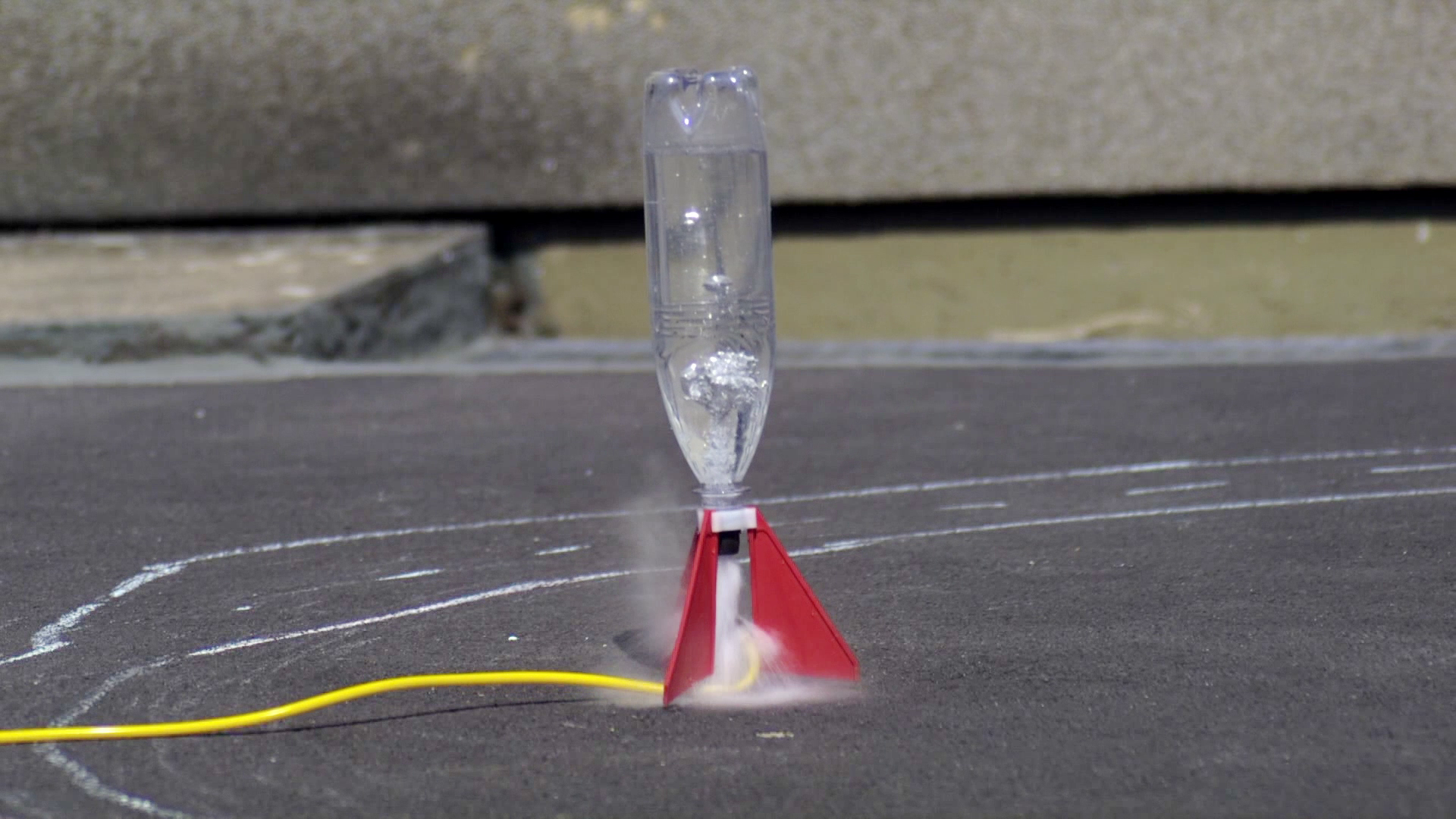
2

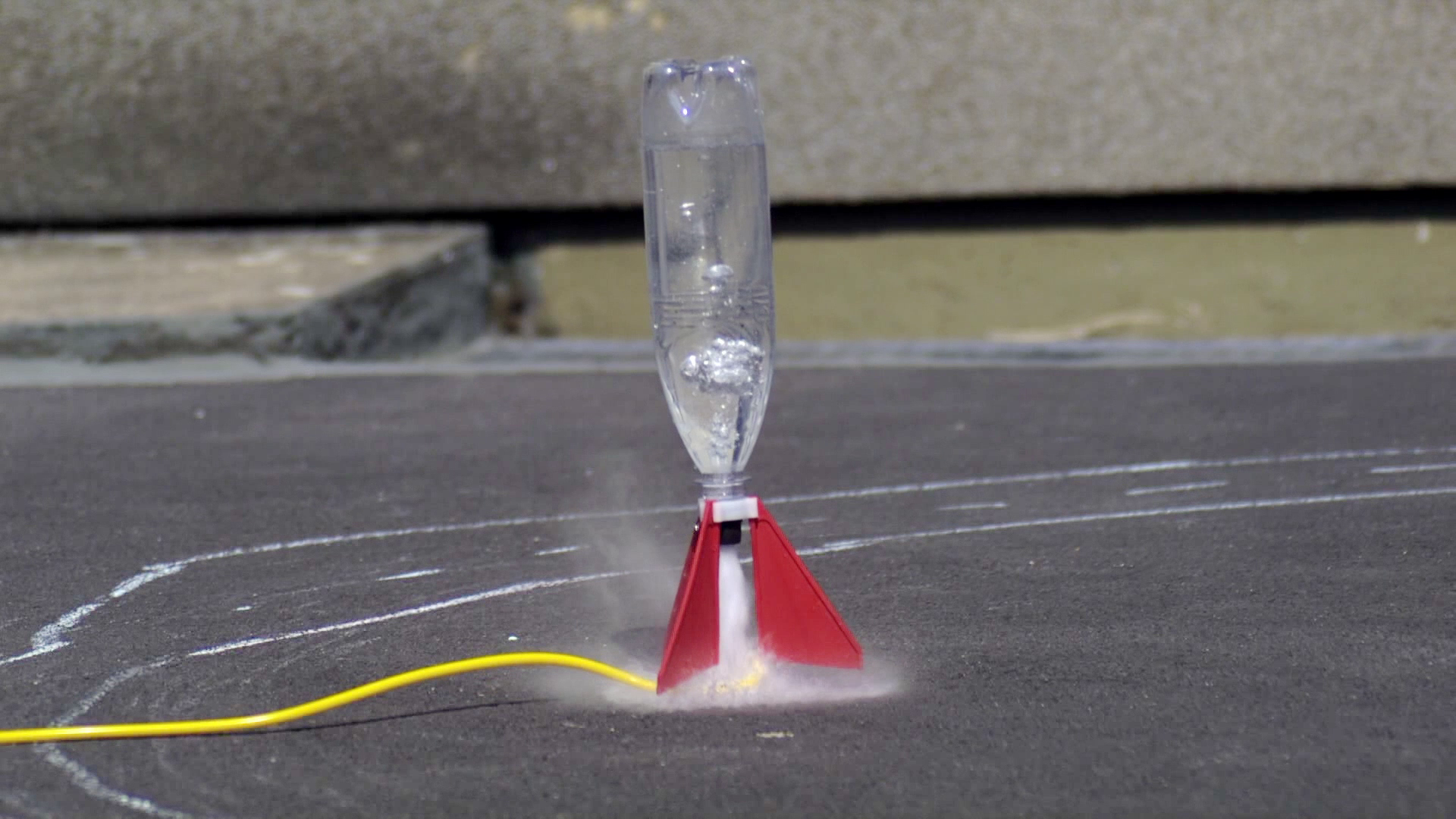
3

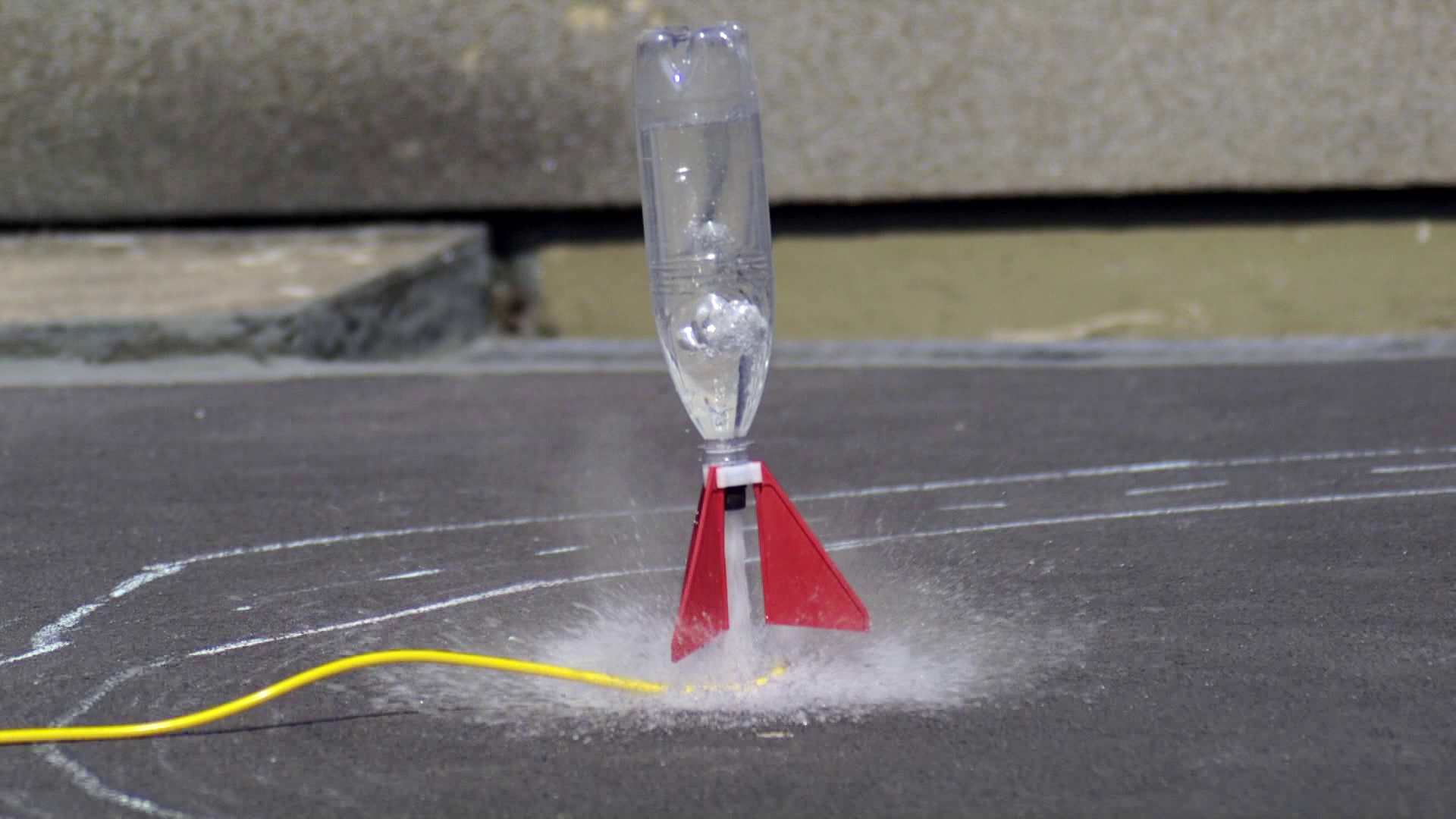
4

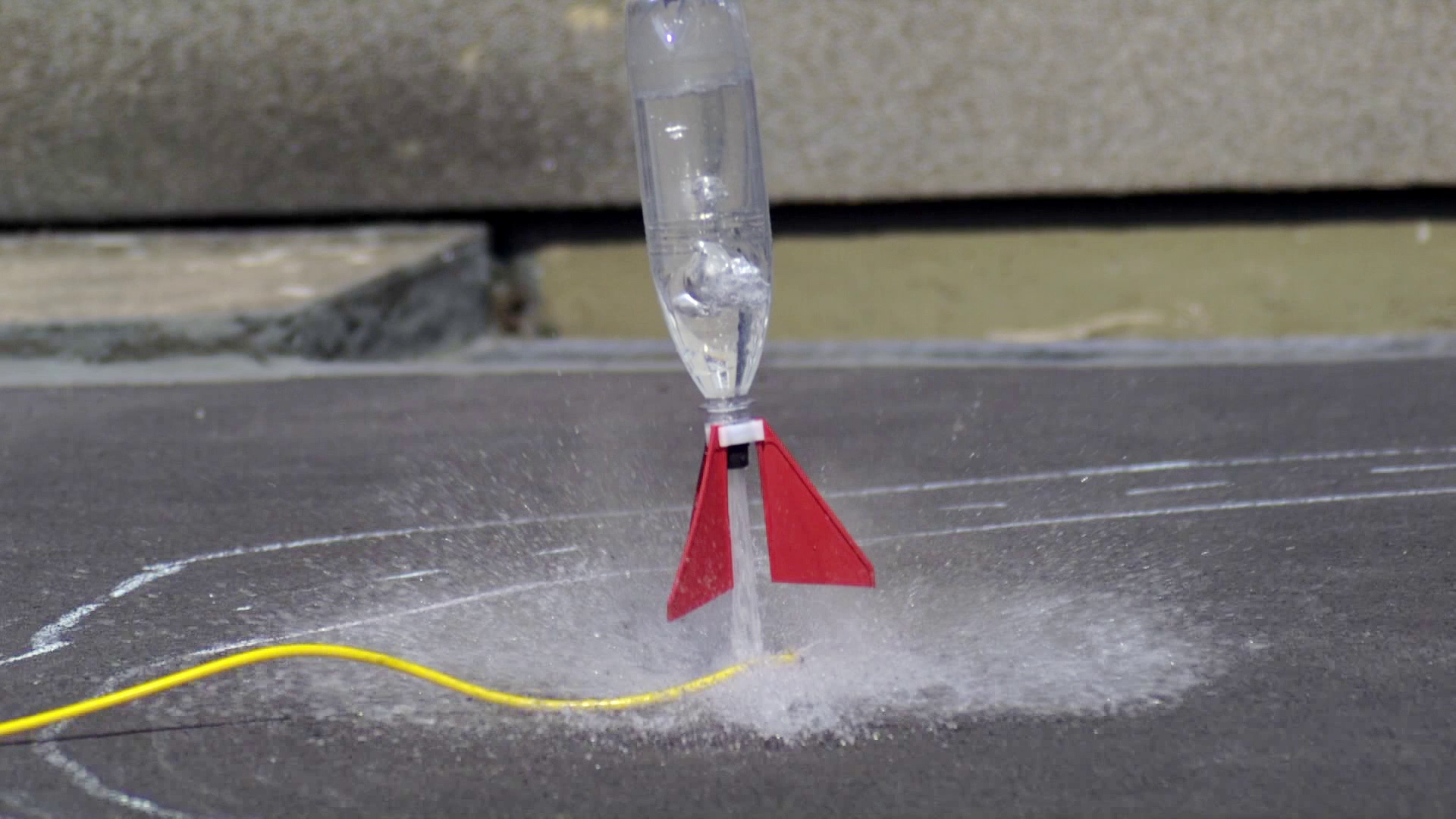
5

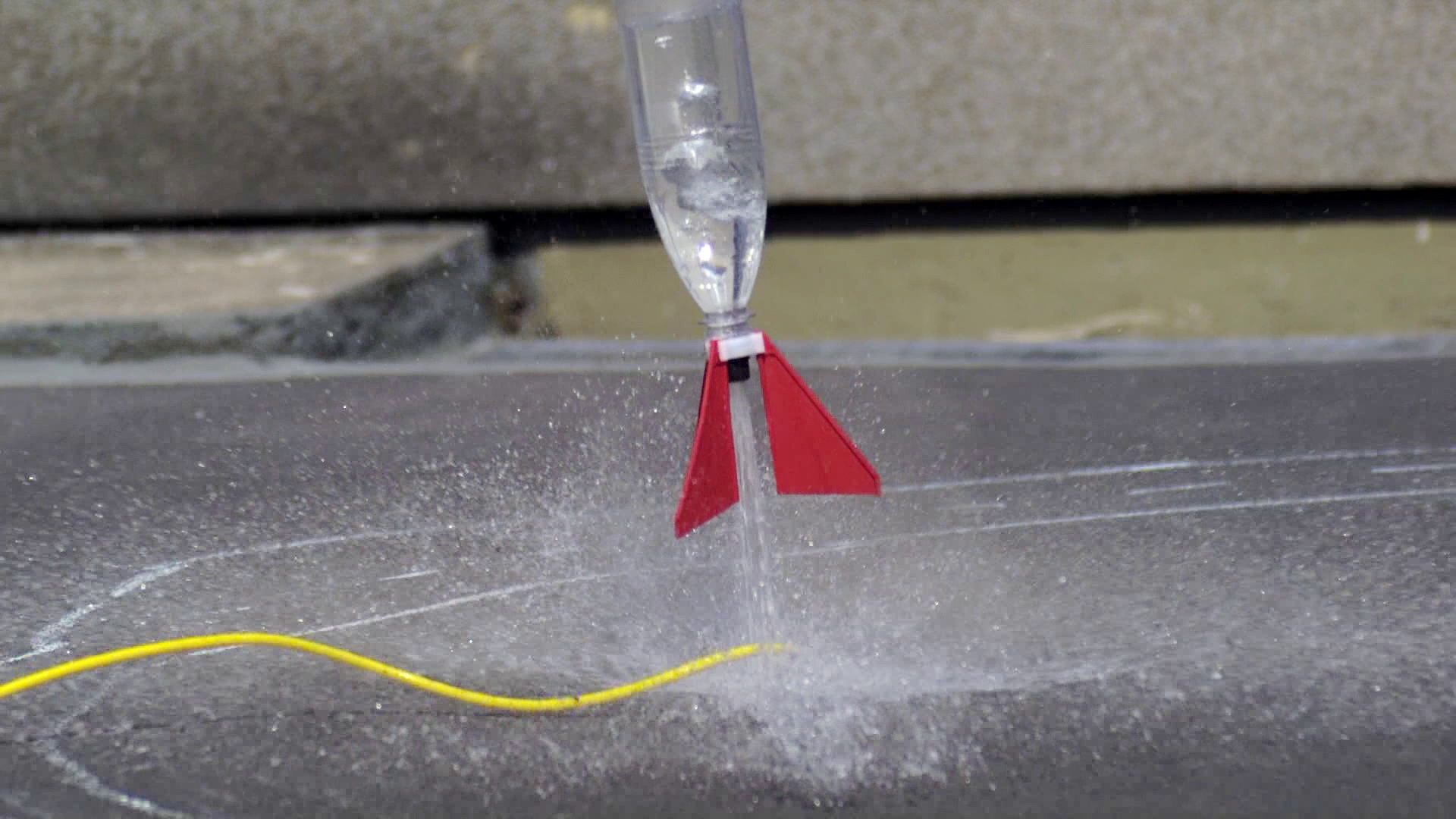
6

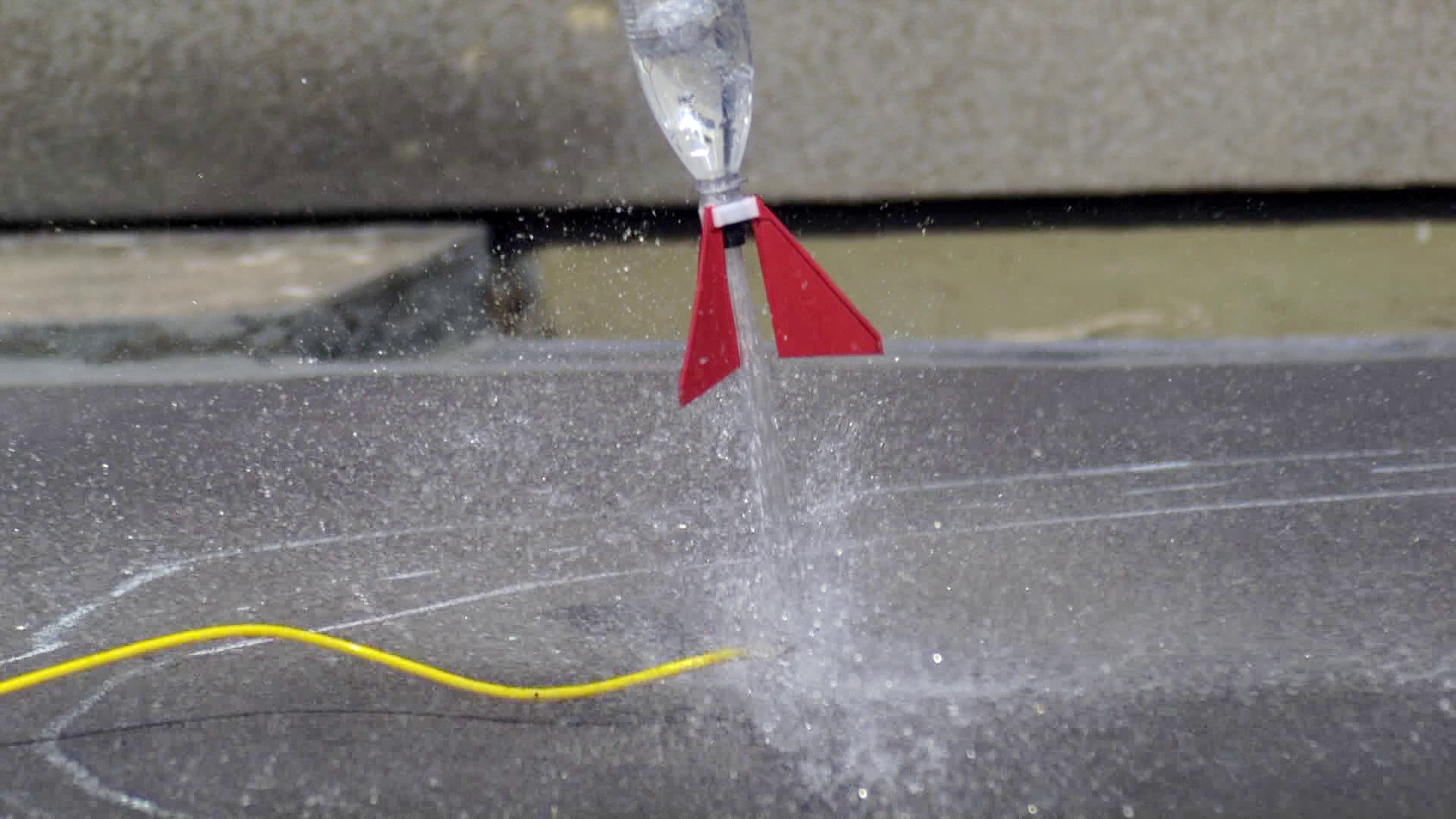
7

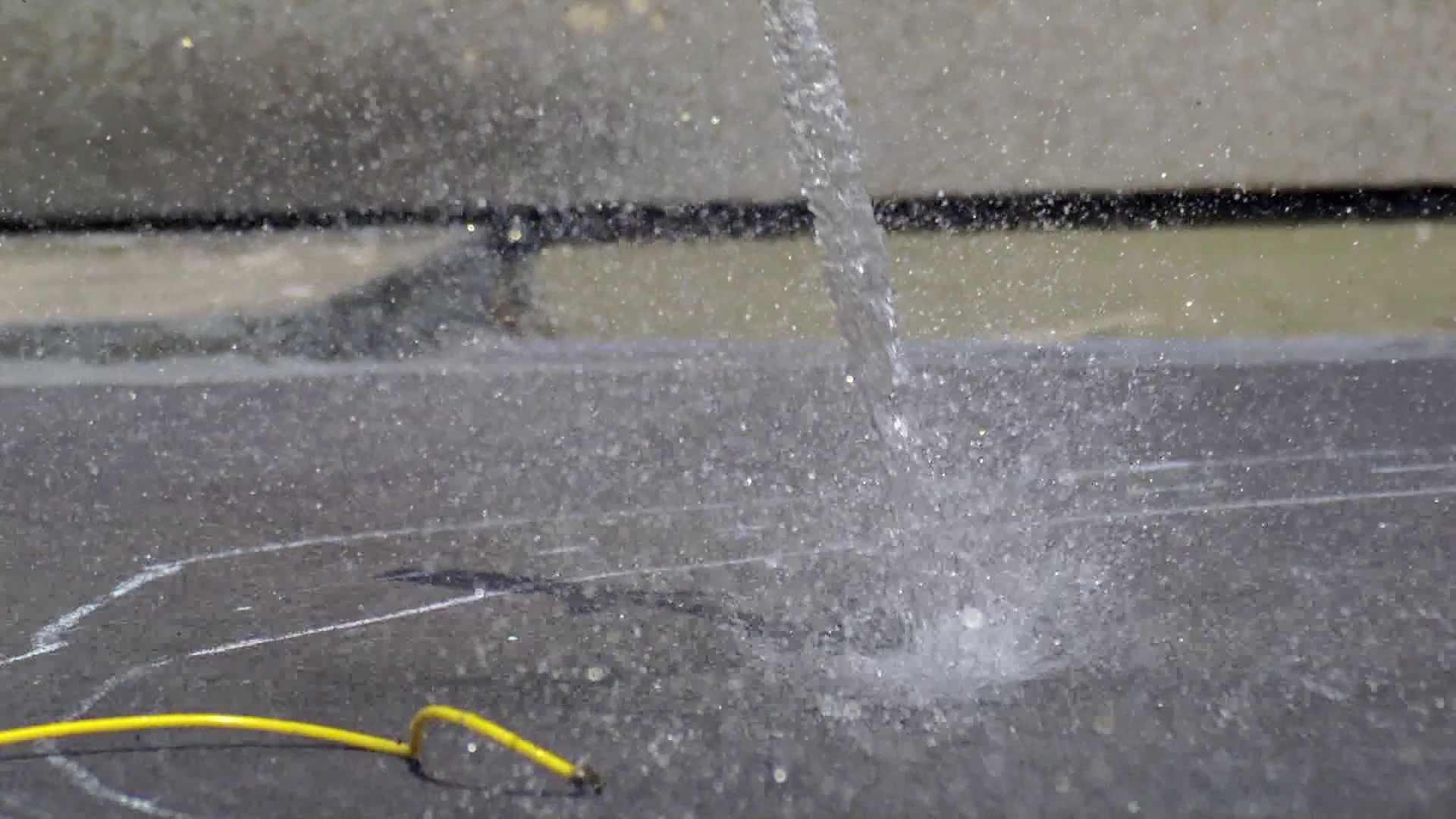
8

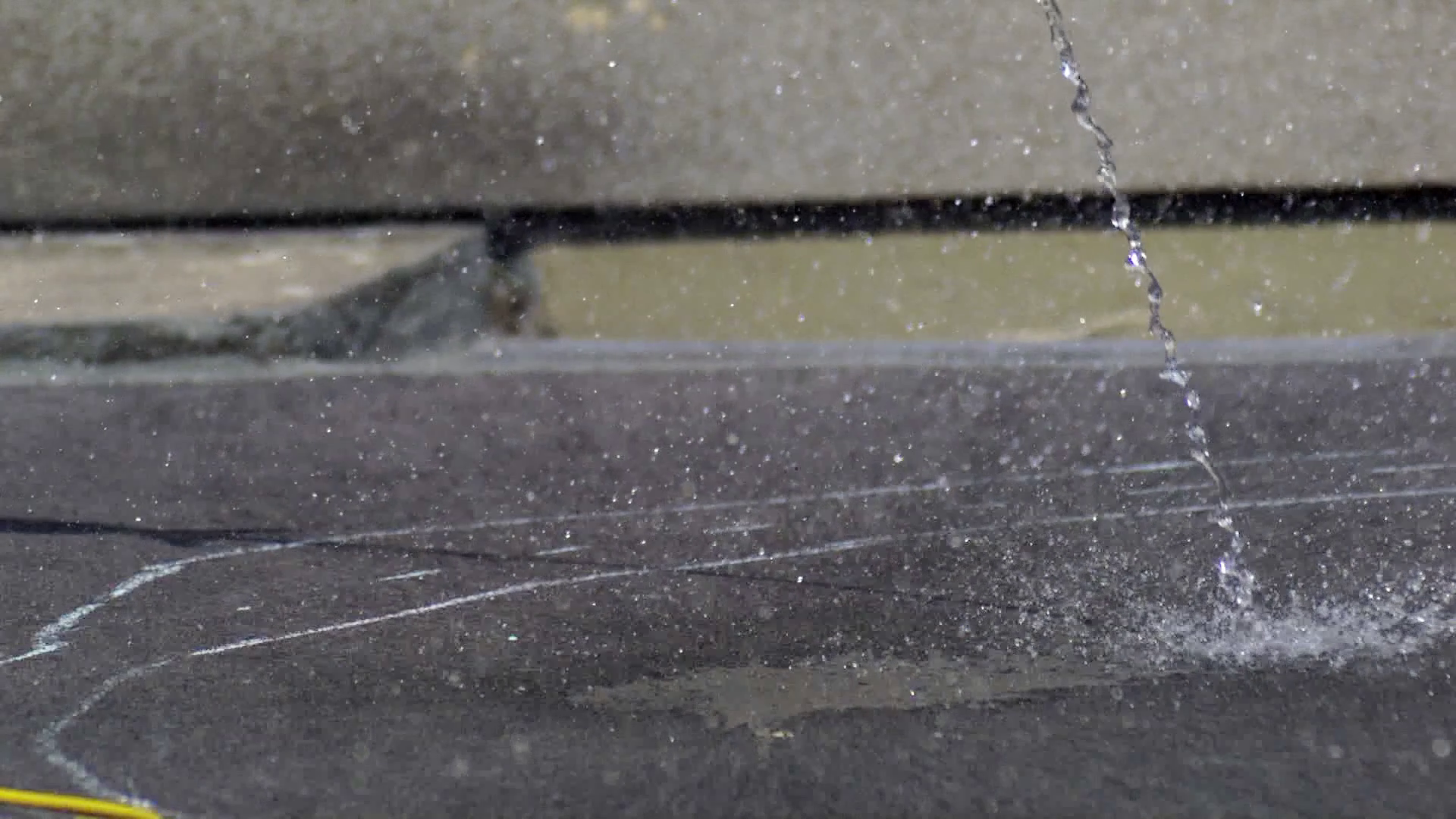
9

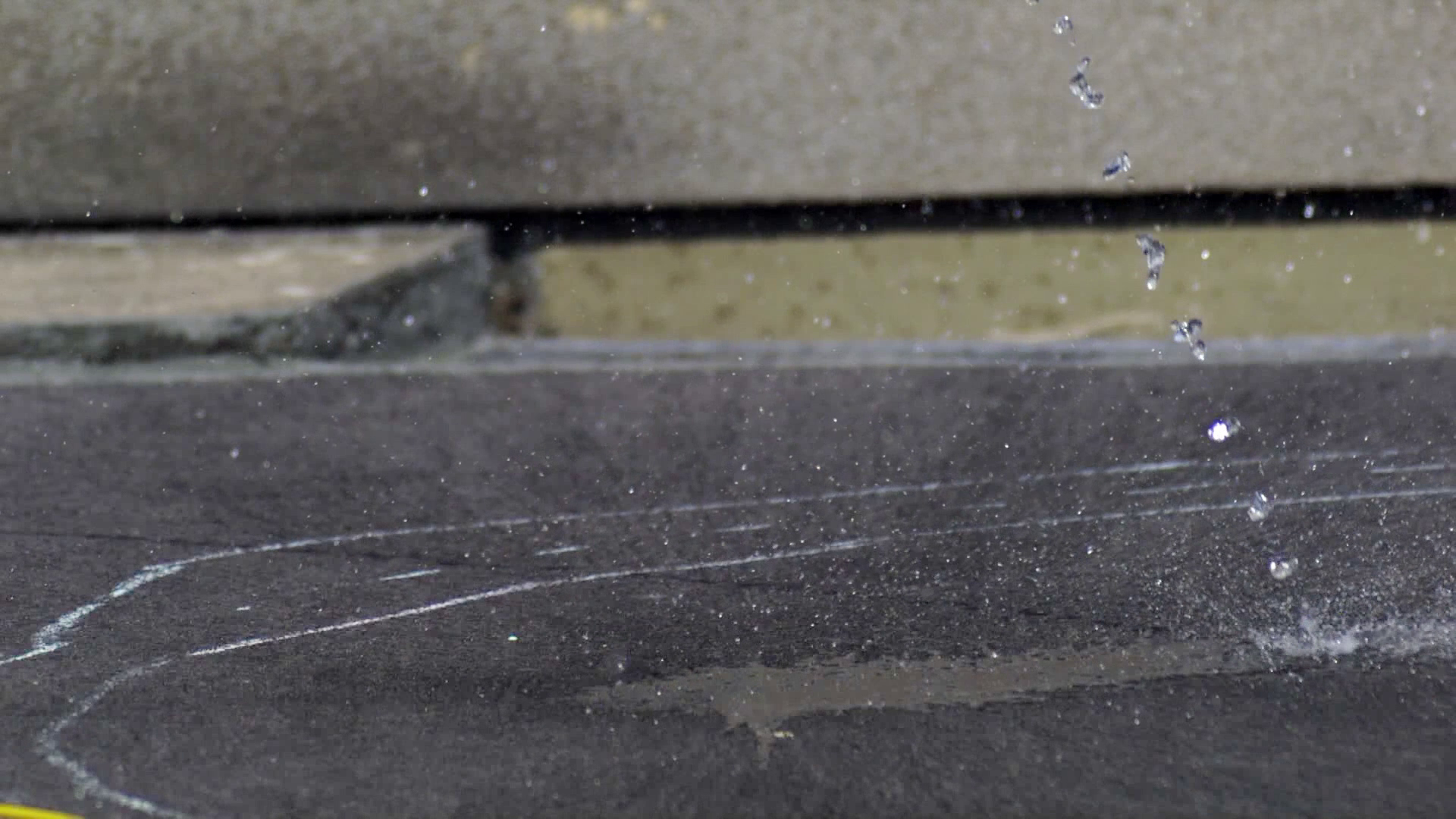
10

== Elements ==
=== Bottle ===
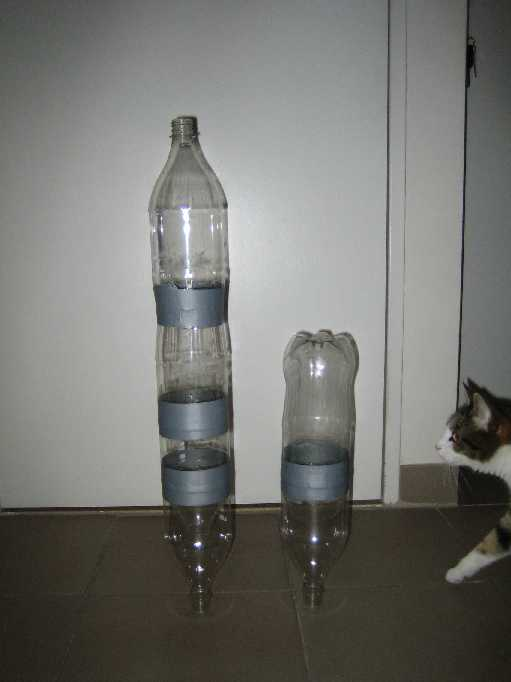
Two multi-bottle rockets with a cat for scale.

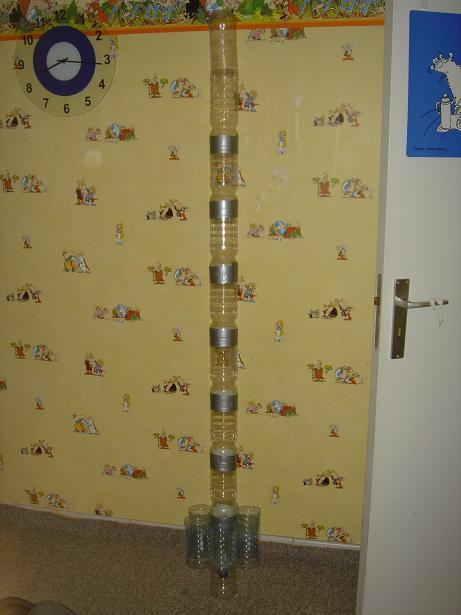
A larger multi bottle rocket with cylindrical fins.

Typically a single polyethylene terephthalate (PET) carbonated soft drink bottle serves as the pressure vessel. Multi-bottle rockets are created by joining two or more bottles in any of several different ways; bottles can be connected via their nozzles, by cutting them apart and sliding the sections over each other, or by connecting them opening to bottom, making a chain to increase volume. This adds complexity and the increased volume leads to increased weight - but this should be offset by an increase in the duration of the thrust of the rocket.

Multi-stage rockets are much more complicated. They involve two or more rockets stacked on top of each other, designed to launch while in the air, much like the multi-stage rockets that are used to send payloads into space.

=== Gas ===
Several methods for pressurizing a water rocket are used including:

- A standard bicycle/car tire pump, capable of reaching at least 75 psi (520 kPa).
- Water pressure forcing all the air in an empty water hose into the rocket. Pressure is the same as the water main.
- An air compressor, like those used in workshops to power pneumatic equipment and tools. Modifying a high pressure (greater than 15 bar / 1500 kPa / 200 psi) compressor to work as a water rocket power source can be dangerous, as can using high-pressure gases from cylinders.
- Compressed gases in bottles, like carbon dioxide (CO_{2}), air, and nitrogen gas (N_{2}). Examples include CO_{2} in paintball cylinders and air in industrial and SCUBA cylinders. Care must be taken with bottled gases: as the compressed gas expands, it cools (see gas laws) and rocket components cool as well. Some materials, such as PVC and ABS, can become brittle and weak when severely cooled. Long air hoses are used to maintain a safe distance, and pressure gauges (manometers) and safety valves are typically utilized on launcher installations to avoid over-pressurizing rockets and having them explode before they can be launched. Highly pressurized gases such as those in diving cylinders or vessels from industrial gas suppliers should only be used by trained operators, and the gas should be delivered to the rocket via a regulator device (e.g. a SCUBA first-stage). All compressed gas containers are subject to local, state and national laws in most countries and must be safety tested periodically by a certified test center.
- Sublimating carbon dioxide gas from dry ice. Dry ice expands 800 times in volume upon sublimation. A #3 rubber stopper is forcefully inserted into the neck of a two-liter plastic bottle partially filled with water. The pressure builds up enough to pop the stopper out.
- Ignition of a mixture of explosive gases above the water in the bottle; the explosion creates the pressure to launch the rocket into the air.

=== Nozzles ===
Water rocket nozzles differ from conventional combustion rocket nozzles in that they do not have a divergent section such as in a De Laval nozzle. Because water is essentially incompressible the divergent section does not contribute to efficiency and actually can make performance worse.

There are two main classes of water rocket nozzles:

- Open also sometimes referred to as "standard" or "full-bore" having an inside diameter of ≈22mm which is the standard soda bottle neck opening.
- Restricted which is anything smaller than the "standard". A popular restricted nozzle has an inside diameter of 9mm and is known as a "Gardena nozzle" named after a common garden hose quick connector used to make them.

The size of the nozzle affects the thrust produced by the rocket. Larger diameter nozzles provide faster acceleration with a shorter thrust phase, while smaller nozzles provide lower acceleration with a longer thrust phase.

=== Fins ===
As the propellant level in the rocket goes down, the center of mass initially moves downwards before finally moving upwards again as the propellant is depleted. This initial movement reduces stability and can cause water rockets to start tumbling end over end, greatly decreasing the maximum speed and thus the length of glide (time that the rocket is flying under its own momentum).

To lower the center of pressure and add stability, fins or other stabilizers can be added which bring the center of drag further back, well behind the center of mass at all times. Stabilizers of any sort are normally placed near the back of the bottle where the center of mass is found. The increase in stability which well-designed fins give is worth the extra drag, and helps to maximize the height to which the rocket will fly.

=== Landing systems ===
Stabilizing fins cause the rocket to fly nose-first which will give significantly higher speed, but they will also cause it to fall with a significantly higher velocity than it would if it tumbled to the ground, and this may damage the rocket or whomever or whatever it strikes upon landing.

Some water rockets have parachute or other recovery system to help prevent problems. However, these systems can suffer from malfunctions. This is often taken into account when designing rockets. Rubber bumpers, Crumple zones, and safe launch practices can be utilized to minimize damage or injury caused by a falling rocket.

Another possible recovery system involves simply using the rocket's fins to slow its descent and is sometimes called backward sliding. By increasing fin size, more drag is generated. If the center of mass is placed forward of the fins, the rocket will nose dive. In the case of super-roc or back-gliding rockets, the rocket is designed such that the relationship between center of gravity and the center of pressure of the empty rocket causes the fin-induced tendency of the rocket to tip nose down to be counteracted by the air resistance of the long body which would cause it to fall tail down, and resulting in the rocket falling sideways, slowly.

=== Launch tubes ===
Some water rocket launchers use launch tubes. A launch tube fits inside the nozzle of the rocket and extends upward toward the nose. The launch tube is anchored to the ground. As the rocket begins accelerating upward, the launch tube blocks the nozzle, and very little water is ejected until the rocket leaves the launch tube. This allows almost perfectly efficient conversion of the potential energy in the compressed air to kinetic energy and gravitational potential energy of the rocket and water. The high efficiency during the initial phase of the launch is important, because rocket engines are least efficient at low speeds. A launch tube therefore significantly increases the speed and height attained by the rocket. Launch tubes are most effective when used with long rockets, which can accommodate long launch tubes.

== Competitions ==
The Water Rocket Achievement World Record Association is a worldwide association which administrates competitions for altitude records involving single-stage and multiple-stage water rockets, a flight duration competition, and speed or distance competitions for water rocket–powered cars.

Many local competitions of various sorts are held, including:

- In Scotland, the Oscar Swigelhoffer Trophy is an Aquajet (Water Rocket) competition held at the Annual International Rocket Week in Largs or nearby Paisley, and organized by STAAR Research through John Bonsor. The competition goes back to the mid-1980s, organized by the Paisley Rocketeers who have been active in amateur rocketry since the 1930s. The trophy is named after the late founder of ASTRA, Oscar Swiglehoffer, who was also a personal friend and student of Hermann Oberth, one of the founding fathers of rocketry. The competition involves team distance flying of water rockets under an agreed pressure and angle of flight. Each team consists of six rockets, which are flown in two flights. The greater distance for each rocket over the two flights is recorded, and the final team distances are collated, with the winning team having the greatest distance. The winner in 2007 was ASTRA.
- In the United Kingdom, the largest water rocket competition is currently the National Physical Laboratory's annual Water Rocket Challenge. The competition was first opened to the public in 2001 and is limited to around 60 teams. It has schools and open categories, and is attended by a variety of "works" and private teams, some travelling from abroad. The rules and goals of the competition vary from year to year.
- In Germany, the oldest and most popular water rocket competition is the Freestyle-Physics Water Rocket Competition. The competition is one part of a larger part of a student physics competition, where students are tasked to construct various machines and enter them in competitive contests.
- In the United States, the Science Olympiad also runs water rocket event for elementary school age contestants.
- In Pakistan a water rocket competition is held every year in World Space Week by Suparco Institute Of Technical Training (SITT) in which different schools from all over the Pakistan take part.
- In Ukraine, a Water Rocket Competition is held every year in the Center for Innovative Technology in Education (CITE). and schools from all over Ukraine take part. The design of the rockets is standardized. The competition promotes the selective collection of solid dry waste in schools.
- In Russia, Water Rocket.

=== World records ===
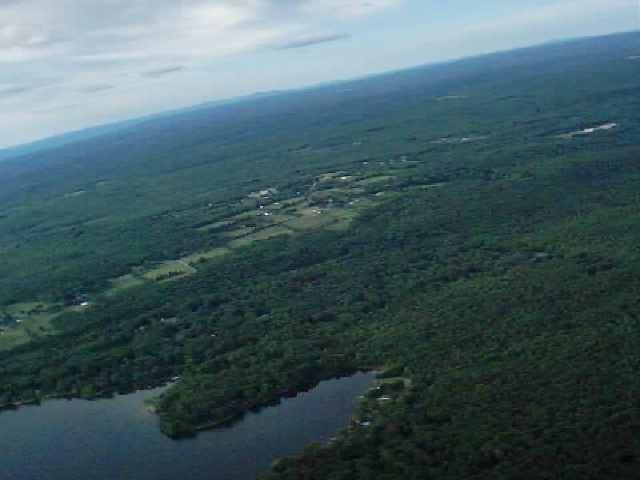
Apogee photograph taken by the onboard video camera from U.S. Water Rockets' record breaking X-12 Water Rocket at an altitude of 2,068 feet (630 m).

The Guinness World Record of launching most water rockets is held by Royal College, Colombo when on 10 November 2017, they launched 1950 of them at the same time.

The Guinness World Record for the largest water rocket, measuring 7.72 metres (25.3 ft) tall and 72.5 centimetres (28.5 in) in diameter, is held by the NPO Showa Gakuen (Japan). It was presented, measured and launched on 2 June 2022, in Taiki, Hokkaido, Japan. The previous record holder was National Physical Laboratory (United Kingdom) with a water rocket measuring 3.40 metres (11.2 ft) tall and 40 centimetres (16 in) in diameter. It was presented, measured and launched on 15 June 2011.

The current record for greatest altitude achieved by a water and air propelled rocket is 2,723 feet (830 meters), held by the University of Cape Town, achieved on 26 August 2015, exceeding the previous 2007 record of 2,044 feet (623 meters) held by US Water Rockets. The rocket also carried a video camera as payload as part of the verification required by the competition rules.

== Hot water rockets ==
A steam rocket, or "hot water rocket", is a rocket that uses water held in a pressure vessel at a high temperature, and which generates thrust through this being released as steam through a rocket nozzle.

== See also ==
- Sodium bicarbonate rocket
- Stomp rocket

== Bibliography ==
- D. Kagan, L. Buchholtz, L. Klein, Soda-bottle water rockets, The Physics Teacher 33, 150-157 (1995)
- C. J. Gommes, A more thorough analysis of water rockets: moist adiabats, transient flows, and inertials forces in a soda bottle, American Journal of Physics 78, 236 (2010)
- A.Romanelli, I.Bove, F.González, Air expansion in a water rocket, American Journal of Physics 81, 762 (2013)
