= Stomp rocket =

Flying toy rocket powered by compressed air

A stomp rocket is a flying toy rocket that is powered by the release of compressed air.

The rocket has a hollow body that fits over a launch tube. The launch tube is a hollow, rigid pipe, with an opening into the rocket body, and a connection to a pipe that is connected to an air bladder. Typical bladders are an air pump, or a flexible bottle (e.g. plastic drink bottle).

When pressure is applied to the bladder (compressing the container) the air contained within is expelled from the bladder. In many home made versions, the bladder is a recycled drinks bottle, from which air is released rapidly by the user jumping, or 'stomping' on the bottle - hence "stomp rocket". The expelled air rushes through the connecting pipe and into the body of the rocket, causing a pressurisation of the air in the rocket's hollow body. The air within the rocket body has to escape, and is expelled to the rear of the rocket, causing the rocket to accelerate upwards along the launch tube in the opposite direction, and then lift into the sky.

The launch tube may be mounted on an adjustable clamp to enable the direction of the launch to be set by the user.

The thrust of a stomp rocket is completely expended in the first instance of flight. For the majority of the flight, only Gravity and aerodynamic forces act on the rocket, unlike on a Water rocket or a 'real' rocket with motors and fuel onboard, which are applying thrust force to the rocket for a large portion of the flight.

== Commercial varieties ==
The Astroblast was a late 1970s-era toy rocket consisting of a plastic chamber with a plunger on top. An adjustable plastic pipe allowed a foam rubber rocket to be launched at any angle when the user stomped on the plunger. A later adaptation of the Astroblast substituted an air pump and release mechanism for the stomp chamber and plunger.

Stomp Rocket is a trademarked name, the owner being Fred Ramirez, President of D&L Company. D&L manufactured their first stomp rocket ever in the early 1990s. There are five versions of D&L Stomp rockets available: the Super High-Performance Stomp Rocket, which travels about 400 feet, the Ultra Stomp Rocket, which travels about 200 feet, the Ultra LED Stomp Rocket, which travels about 100 feet, the Ultra Dueling Stomp Rocket, which travels about 200 feet, and the Junior Stomp Rocket, which travels about 100 feet. The highest stomp rocket ever was 1/4 of a mile in the air. The Rocket is mainly based on the concept of air pressure and sounding rockets
