= William Poteat =

William Poteat may refer to:

- William H. Poteat (1919–2000), philosopher, scholar and professor
- William Louis Poteat (1856–1938), professor and then president of Wake Forest College.
