= Prosch =

Origin
- Language: German from West Slavic
- Meaning: from the personal name Ambrose; from a Slavic personal name with the first element Prosi-
- Region of origin: Germany, United States, Austria

Other names
- Cognates: Proske, Pross

Prosch is a German and North American last name which is either derived from the first name of Greek origin Ambrose or from a diminutive of any of several Slavic personal names with the first component Prosi- (from Proto-Slavic *prositi "to ask"), e.g. Prosimir or Prosislaw. Notable people with the surname include:

- Ferdinand Victor Alphons Prosch (1820–1885), Danish doctor, veterinarian and biologist
- Harry Prosch (1917–2005), American philosopher
- Jay Prosch (born 1992), American football player
- Kevin Prosch, American Christian musician
- Thomas Wickham Prosch (1850–1915), American journalist, newspaper proprietor and historian
