= Judith Fetterley =

Literary scholar (born 1938)

Judith Fetterley (born 1938) is a literary scholar known for her work in feminism and women's studies. She was influential in leading a reappraisal of women's literature of the 19th and 20th centuries, and the contributions of women writing about women's experience, including their perspectives on men in the world.

== Early life and family ==
Judith Fetterley was born in New York City, New York, although she was raised in Toronto, Ontario, Canada for several years. Her family moved to Franklin, Indiana when she was ten. She studied in public schools, then earned her B.A. degree at Swarthmore College. She did graduate work at Indiana University Bloomington, where she earned her Ph.D. in English in 1969.

== Career ==
Fetterley began her academic career at the University of Pennsylvania, where she taught from 1967 to 1973. She moved to the State University of New York at Albany in 1973 where she taught English and women's studies. She left the University at Albany in 2004, having earned the rank of Distinguished Teaching Professor.

Fetterley helped formulate the concept of resistant reading in her 1978 book, The Resisting Reader: A Feminist Approach to American Fiction. In addition, she led a reappraisal of women's literature of the 19th century and the American canon. She pointed out that American literature had been defined as about men and by men, thus excluding half of the world: women's experience and perspective.

In a series of analyses of works by Faulkner, Fitzgerald, Hawthorne, Hemingway, Irving, James, and Mailer, Fetterly in The Resisting Reader places readerly experience at the forefront and argues that American literature—both past and present—has "immasculated" women readers by compelling them to identify with a so-called universal maleness. This immasculation “burns away” [sic] "the merely personal, the purely subjective" and therefore creates in woman readers a "confusion of consciousness" (xi) in which they cannot read as themselves. Citing John Keats’s complaint that poetry exerts a “palpable design” upon readers, Fetterley writes that American literature does something far more insidious: its designs are "impalpable," so women readers fail to recognize its effects (xi). Calling on women readers to intervene, to resist this hailing, Fetterley calls feminist criticism a political act to “to make available to consciousness that which has been left largely unconscious” (xii) and to "change [sic] the consciousness of those who read and their relation to what they read" (vii).

Now recognized as a classic of feminist literary criticism, The Resisting Reader generated both praise and critique upon publication. Reviewers were quick to point out that in approach, style, and tone, Fetterley echoed Kate Millett, whose Sexual Politics had preceded The Resisting Reader by almost a decade. For many feminist commentators, this continuity suggested the growth of feminist literary criticism, as well as the continued need for "naming the felt reality of American fiction." As a review in the Women's Studies International Quarterly puts it, "Fetterley's questions are so often crucial, her observations repeatedly so acute, that they force us to ask how we avoided them in the past." Still others admired the book's feminist heart while expressing discomfort with the vehemence of Fetterley's "tone and emphasis." The book also saw its share of anti-feminist response, most of which faulted Fetterley—and by extension, feminism—for an overly narrow and repetitive focus on sexism and gender. Her arguments around resistant readings in this book have since been challenged by Timothy Bewes, a literary critic associated with postcritique, who proposes an approach that involved "reading with the grain."

In 1980, Fetterley began the project of reading and writing about 19th century American women writers. This resulted in three major publications and a series of articles. Provisions: A Reader from 19th Century American Women appeared in 1985 and American Women Regionalists, co-edited with Marjorie Pryse, appeared 1992. Writing Out of Place: Regionalism, Women and American Literary Culture, written with Marjorie Pryse, appeared in 2003.

Since leaving the academic world, Fetterley has become a semi-professional gardener, with a small perennial garden design business called Perennial Wisdom (perennialwisdom.net). She is currently writing a memoir about her experience as a gardener.

== Works ==
- - The Resisting Reader: A Feminist Approach to American Fiction, Bloomington, Indiana: Indiana University Press
- - Provisions: A Reader from 19th-Century American Women, Bloomington, Indiana: Indiana University Press

== General Reference ==
- Judith Fetterley Papers, 1971-1993. M.E. Grenander Department of Special Collections and Archives, University Libraries, University at Albany, State University of New York (hereafter referred to as the Fetterley Papers).

== Sources ==
- David H. Richter, ed., The Critical Tradition: Classic Texts and Contemporary Trends, 3rd ed., Boston: Bedford/St. Martin's, 2007.
- The University at Albany, State University of New York Faculty Website
