= Jonathan Luke Austin =

British sociologist and political scientist (born 1988)

Education
- Education: IHEID

Philosophical work
- School: International Relations, International Political Sociology, Pragmatist Sociology, Science and Technology Studies
- Institutions: University of Copenhagen
- Notable ideas: Humanitarian design; post-critique; compositionism; material-aesthetics; international political design and ergonomics;

Jonathan Luke Austin (born 1988) is a political theorist and political scientist. Austin is currently a professor at the University of Copenhagen. He is also Director of the Centre for Advanced Security Theory at the same university. Previously he was Lead Researcher at the Geneva-based Violence Prevention (VIPRE) Initiative, hosted by the Graduate Institute of International and Development Studies, where he is also a visiting professor. Austin has previously been based at the University of Copenhagen, the University of Ottawa, and the Orient-Institut Beirut.

Austin is widely known for his work in the fields of International Political Sociology (security studies), critical security studies, and International Relations.

Theoretically, Austin has played a central role in reconsidering the status of critique in International Relations, mainly through his engagements with pragmatist sociologies, science and technology studies, and postcritique. He has also been a key advocate for extending the ‘materialism’ of the practice of International Relations, suggesting social scientific practice must move beyond its present preoccupation with epistemic modes of inquiry.

Empirically, much of Austin's work has revolved around exploring the ontologies of political violence. This includes a significant research programme studying the conditions of possibility underlying torture, conducted through both secondary sources and the interviewing of perpetrators.

Practically, Austin is known for applying ‘high’ social theory to concrete international problems. This is currently occurring through the application of material-semiotic social theories to the challenge of violence prevention. For this work, Austin was nominated among the ‘faces of peace’ in recognition of his Peacebuilding activities by the University of Geneva and Geneva Peacebuilding Platform.

Currently, Austin is the Principal Investigator of the Future of Humanitarian Design research project, which is scientifically based on his previous work on violence prevention. In 2026 he curated an exhibition at the International Red Cross and Red Crescent Museum titled Humanitarian, by design? Le design au cœur de l’humanitaire.
