= Arnold Eucken =

German scientist (1884–1950)

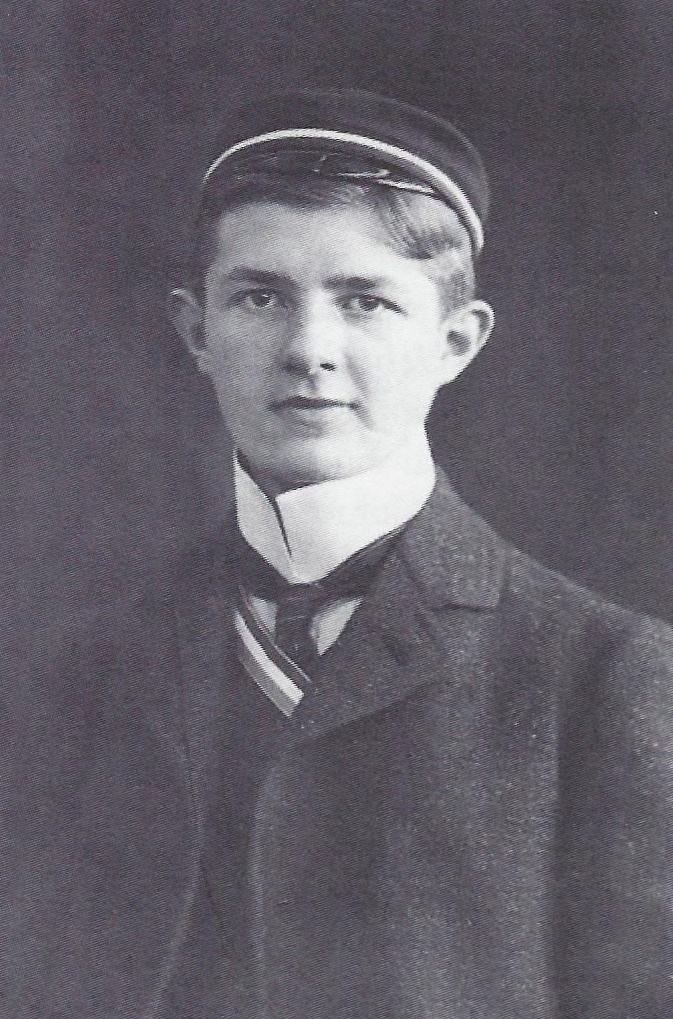
- Eucken, c. 1905
- Born: Arnold Thomas Eucken; 3 July 1884; Jena, Saxe-Weimar-Eisenach, German Empire
- Died: 16 June 1950 (aged 65); Seebruck, West Germany
- Education: University of Berlin (PhD, 1906)
- Known for: Eucken's law Eucken–Polanyi potential theory Heat capacity of hydrogen gas
- Father: Rudolf Christoph Eucken
- Scientific career
- Fields: Physical chemistry
- Institutions: University of Göttingen
- Thesis: Der stationäre Zustand zwischen polarisierten Wasserstoffelektrode (1906)
- Doctoral advisor: Walther Nernst
- Doctoral students: Manfred Eigen

Arnold Thomas Eucken (German: [ˈɔʏkn̩]; 3 July 1884 – 16 June 1950) was a German chemist and physicist. He is known for his contribution to thermodynamics and molecular physics, in particular, for the discovery of Eucken's law of thermal conductivity, the measurement of the heat capacity of hydrogen at low temperatures, and the development of the Eucken–Polanyi potential theory of adsorption.

== Life ==
Arnold Thomas Eucken was born in Jena, son of the philosopher and later Nobel Prize in Literature laureate Rudolf Christoph Eucken, in Jena. A maternal great grandfather was the physicist Thomas Johann Seebeck. His brother Walter became an economist.

Arnold Eucken went to the humanist high school in Jena and studied Physics and Mathematics at the Kiel University, University of Jena and University of Berlin. In 1905 he began to work in Berlin under Walther Nernst on the energy states of hydrogen and received a doctorate in 1906.

He habilitated in 1911 and after the Italo-Turkish War he joined back in 1915 Eucken at the Technische Hochschule Breslau, and from 1930 at the University of Göttingen as a successor of Gustav Tammann. After "the seizure of power" of the National Socialists, Eucken became a member of the Nazi Party in 1933. A major contribution was a "Textbook of Chemical Physics" first published in 1930.

One of his last PhD students, Manfred Eigen won the Nobel Prize in Chemistry in 1967.

Eucken killed himself in Seebruck on 16 June 1950.

== Work ==
In 1908, while working with Nernst, Eucken developed a vacuum calorimeter to study heat capacity hydrogen molecules. His measurements published in 1912, confirmed that the heat capacity of hydrogen drops by a factor of a gas constant R at low temperatures (about 40 K). Diatomic gas starts to behave as a monotoatomic gas because of the suppression of rotational modes at low temperatures. This confirmed Nernst's theory that the heat capacity of diatomic molecules would behave according to quantum mechanics.

Eucken's 1911 work on thermal conduction, demonstrated that in dielectric systems, the thermal conductivity of the crystal in inversely proportional to the temperature of the crystal. This relation is sometimes known as Eucken's law.

Eucken was also coined the term adsorption potential and was the first to publish a theory of potential theory of adsorption in 1914.

== See also ==
- Spin isomers of hydrogen
