= List of fellows of the Royal Society elected in 1944 =

This is a list of people elected Fellow of the Royal Society in 1944.

== Fellows ==
- Ralph Alger Bagnold
- Ronald Percy Bell
- Hendrik Johannes van der Bijl
- Stanley Melbourne Bruce, Viscount Bruce of Melbourne
- Cecil Reginald Burch
- Subrahmanyan Chandrasekhar
- Sir George Edward Raven Deacon
- Sir Jack Cecil Drummond
- Alexander Thomas Glenny
- Sir Ronald George Hatton
- Robert Downs Haworth
- William Ogilvy Kermack
- Franklin Kidd
- Guy Frederic Marrian
- Bryan Austin McSwiney
- Michael Polanyi
- Alec Sand
- Sir William Arthur Stanier
- Sir Cyril James Stubblefield
- Oscar Werner Tiegs
- John Henry Constantine Whitehead

== Foreign members ==
- Oswald Theodore Avery
- Maurice Lugeon
- Theodor Svedburg
- Nils Eberhard Svedelius
- Stephen Prokofievitch Timoshenko
