= Proske =

Origin
- Language: German from West Slavic
- Meaning: from the personal name Ambrose; from a Slavic personal name with the first element Prosi-
- Region of origin: Germany, United States

Other names
- Cognates: Prosch, Pross

Proske is a German and North American last name which is either derived from the first name of Greek origin Ambrose or from a diminutive of any of several Slavic personal names with the first component Prosi- (from Proto-Slavic *prositi "to ask"), e.g. Prosimir or Prosislaw. Notable people with the surname include:

- Andrea Proske (born 1986), Canadian rower and Olympic gold medalist
- Beatrice Gilman Proske (1899–2002), American art historian
- Jenn Proske (born 1987), Canadian American actress
- Karl Proske (1794–1861), German Catholic cleric
- Oliver Proske (born 1971), German stage designer
- Uwe Proske (born 1961), German fencer
