= Resistant reading =

Approach to textual analysis

A resistant reading, a concept partly formulated by Judith Fetterley, is a reading of a text which moves beyond the dominant cultural beliefs to challenge prevailing views. It means to read a text as it was not meant to be read; in fact reading the text against itself.

== Textual example ==
By way of illustration, consider Andrew Marvell's poem To His Coy Mistress.

A resistant reading may develop from an alternative reading, pointing out how the representation of gender in the poem furthers the notion of gender as binary oppositions, the male is active and powerful, the female is passive and marginalized. As such, it will be read by readers who share feminist views of the world as a place structured by gender inequality and discrimination against women. For example, Marvell's representation of heterosexuality in the poem may be read as being exploitative, based as it is on the persona psychologically terrorizing the woman. Marvell depicts his persona as attempting to have the woman submit as a result of the fear he seeks to instill within her; Marvell's vivid and confronting imagery is most significant and not accidental:

Nor, in thy marble Vault, shall sound

My echoing Song: then Worms shall try

That long preserv'd Virginity:...

== Historical Approaches ==
Theories of resistant reading have been identified in a number of historic approaches to the question of interpretation. Michel de Certeau describes reading as wayward act that refuses to follow the prescriptive protocols of others. Readers 'move across lands belonging to someone else,' writes de Certeau, 'like nomads poaching their way across fields they did not write, despoiling the wealth of Egypt to enjoy it themselves'. Roger Chartier has argued that reading is something that 'only rarely leaves traces, that is scattered in an infinity of singular acts, and that easily shakes off all constraints.' A number of historians of reading have elaborated on the idea to interpret readers of the past. Bill Bell, for example, has discovered a range of resistant hermeneutic strategies across nineteenth-century communities, from emigrants and convicts to polar explorers and troops in the First World War. Cultural theorist Islam Issa has expanded the idea through his theory 'resistant reception', stating that 'the human struggle for interpretation ... extend[s] beyond reading'. In the context of Shakespeare, Issa's theory 'connects Shakespeare's work to wider issues outside of the text itself'.

== Importance ==
Resistant reading is an element of some current critical and interpretive repertoire. It is worth considering whether diegetic border crossing always strengthens the potential for resistant reading (as might seem intuitively likely, given that readers are moving in and out of the story), or whether on some occasions it might trigger the reverse effect.

== See also ==
- Judith Fetterley
- The Resisting Reader (1977), by Judith Fetterley
- Robert Belton, Sights of Resistance: Approaches to Canadian Visual Culture (Calgary: University of Calgary Press, 2001).
- Postcritique
