= William H. Poteat =

American philosopher

- Bill Poteat, Duke University, circa 1985
- Born: 19 April 1919; Kaifeng, Henan, China
- Died: 17 May 2000 (aged 81); Durham, North Carolina, United States
- Awards: Gurney Harris Kearns Fellow (1949), Kent Fellow (1949), Outstanding Teacher at University of North Carolina at Chapel Hill (1955), National Faculty of the Humanities (1969)

Education
- Education: Oberlin College (BA 1941), Yale Divinity School (BD 1944), Duke University (PhD 1951)

Philosophical work
- Era: Contemporary philosophy
- Region: Western philosophy
- School: Continental philosophy
- Institutions: University of North Carolina at Chapel Hill, Duke University
- Main interests: Philosophical Anthropology, critique of Cartesian-modernist intellectual culture, Post-Critical, Philosophy of Michael Polanyi
- Notable works: Polanyian Meditations: In Search of a Post-Critical Logic (Dec 1985), A Philosophical Daybook: Post-Critical Investigations (Aug 1990), Recovering the Ground: Critical Exercises in Recollection (Oct 1994), The Primacy of Persons and the Language of Culture: Essays by William H. Poteat (Dec 1993)
- Notable ideas: Existential self-recovery, human person as mindbody, pedagogic irony, critique of self-abstracting tendencies of Modernity

William H. Poteat (19 April 1919 – 17 May 2000) was an American philosopher, scholar, and professor of philosophy, religion, and culture at the University of North Carolina at Chapel Hill from 1947 to 1957 and at Duke University from 1960 to 1987. During that time he did foundational work in the critique of Modern and Postmodern intellectual culture. He was instrumental in introducing scientist-philosopher Michael Polanyi and his Post-Critical philosophy to the United States. He was a master of the Socratic Method of teaching and identified himself a "practicing dialectician," skilled through the use of irony in "understanding and elucidating conflicting points of view"

As a "Post-Critical" philosopher, he encouraged his students and the readers of his books to recover their authentic selves from the confusing, self-alienating abstractions of modern intellectual life. This task and purpose Poteat came to recognize as profoundly convergent with Michael Polanyi's critique of Modern Critical thought. His teaching and writing also drew upon and combined in new ways the ideas of seminal critics of modern culture such as Pascal, Kierkegaard, Arendt, Wittgenstein in his later works, and Merleau-Ponty—whose thinking Poteat came to identify as "Post-Critical" (rather than Postmodern), using a key concept from Michael Polanyi's Personal Knowledge: Towards a Post-Critical Philosophy. His papers are archived at the Yale Divinity School Library.

== Biography ==
William Hardman Poteat was born in Kaifeng, Henan, China on 19 April 1919 to Edwin McNeill Poteat Jr. and Wilda Hardman Poteat, both Baptist missionaries. His father later served as president of Colgate Rochester Crozer Divinity School and twice as minister of Pullen Memorial Baptist Church in Raleigh, North Carolina. His grandfather, Edwin McNeill Poteat Sr., was president of Furman University and in the 1920s his great-uncle, William Louis (Billy) Poteat, had served as president of what is now Wake Forest University. Another great-uncle was Hubert Poteat, a renowned Latin scholar at Wake Forest and an outstanding organist. His great-aunt, Ida Isabella Poteat, for many years headed the Art Department at Meredith College.

William Poteat spent the first ten years of his life in China, where his two younger siblings Elisabeth and Haley were also born, before the family moved to North Carolina where in 1937 he completed his high school education in Raleigh. He attended Oberlin College and was awarded the Bachelor of Arts degree with Phi Beta Kappa honors in 1941. He then attended the Yale Divinity School, where his primary mentor was the Christian theologian H. Richard Niebuhr.

In 1943 he and Marian Kelley were married upon her graduation from Oberlin. He was graduated from Yale in 1944, receiving the Bachelor of Divinity (BD) degree (equivalent to the contemporary Master of Divinity or M.Div.). They had three children, Anne Carlyle, Susan Colquitt, and Edwin McNeill Poteat III.

He and Marian moved to Chapel Hill in the summer of 1944, where he had been hired as general secretary of the Chapel Hill YMCA, then a center for Christian fellowship and a hub of political and intellectual activity for UNC students. He was invited to teach several courses in the UNC Philosophy Department. The popularity of his courses led to his being hired to teach philosophy as a full-time Instructor in 1947, and by 1955 he had risen to the rank of associate professor. He became one of UNC's most popular philosophy teachers, receiving an Outstanding Teacher award in 1955; during the 1956 academic year Carolina students conducted a campaign (unsuccessful) to have him appointed the chancellor of the university.

While enrolled in graduate courses during his studies at Yale, Poteat had become a good friend of Robert Cushman, an aspiring Plato scholar, who was later hired by Duke University to develop a Ph.D. program in Religion. He invited Poteat to enter the new program. Poteat began his coursework in 1947, was appointed a Gurney Harris Kearns Fellow and a Kent Fellow in 1949, and finished his course work in the spring term of 1950.

Poteat completed his Ph.D. at Duke in 1951 after successfully defending his dissertation, "Pascal and Modern Sensibility". He later said that he "was thus well begun by this early essay in becoming a Post-Critical thinker," having thereby established his lifelong intellectual agenda. Though the dissertation was ostensibly about Pascal, it was actually about what Pascal strove to accomplish: to identify, combat, and overcome the self-abstracting, self-alienating, person-occluding tendencies inherent in modern modes of reflection from the Renaissance forward, epitomized in the ideas of Descartes.

In 1955 and again in 1957 Poteat traveled to England to speak at and participate in the Student Christian Movement conferences at Oxford University. During his first trip he traveled to Manchester University for his first meeting with scientist-philosopher Michael Polanyi, beginning a lifelong personal and professional relationship that was to shape much of the course of Poteat's subsequent thinking and research. From Polanyi he received and immediately began reading a typescript of Polanyi's Gifford Lectures (1951–52), which was later revised and published as Personal Knowledge: Towards a Post-critical Philosophy (1958). He had first encountered Polanyi's writing in 1952 through an essay called "The Stability of Beliefs" in the British Journal for the Philosophy of Science, which was incorporated into Personal Knowledge. Poteat reflected on his initial encounter with Polanyi's work as having "accredited and greatly enriched the context within which initially to obey my own intimations."

For three years (1957–1960) he taught at the Episcopal Theological Seminary of the Southwest at Austin, Texas. Having been a professor of philosophy at UNC, he was asked to develop Christianity and Culture courses there, including courses in Philosophical Theology and Christian Criticism. In 1962 he was a visiting research fellow of Merton College at Oxford.

In 1960 Poteat joined the faculty of the Duke University Divinity School as an associate professor of Christianity and culture. Like other members of Duke's Divinity School faculty, he regularly taught graduate courses for the Department of Religion, which were mainly of a philosophical nature. He brought Michael Polanyi's ideas into his teaching via seminars focusing on Polanyi's magnum opus Personal Knowledge, and he arranged for Polanyi himself to deliver the Duke Lectures for Spring Term of 1964, entitled "Man in Thought". Poteat was also a participant in the Polanyi-centered Study Group on Foundations of Cultural Unity in August 1965 and August 1966 at Bowdoin College, organized by Edward Pols, Polanyi, and Marjorie Grene; participants included Elizabeth Sewell, John Silber, Iris Murdoch, and Charles Taylor, among others, led by Polanyi, Grene, and Pols.

In the summer of 1968 he and his colleague, Thomas A. Langford, completed editorial work on Intellect and Hope: Essays in the Thought of Michael Polanyi, published that year by Duke University Press for the Lilly Endowment's Research Program in Christianity and Politics. This book, a festschrift, was one of the first book-length interdisciplinary discussions of Polanyi's philosophical work by major scholars in the U.S. and Europe. Also in 1968, Poteat transferred from the Duke Divinity School to teach full-time in Duke's Department of Religion as Professor of Religion and Comparative Studies.

That same year a group of Poteat's current and former graduate students gathered in a retreat setting at Fort Caswell, South Carolina, to share in the intellectual friendship that they had enjoyed under his mentorship and to ponder some of the many issues he had posed for them to consider. Poteat himself joined the following year, when the group met at a retreat center in the mountains near Dutch Creek Falls, North Carolina. The meetings continued approximately annually under a number of names including "the Poteat Bunch", "La Cosa Nostra della Poteat", and "The Dutch Creek Falls Symposium", concluding in 1975 at a location just outside Chapel Hill. At subsequent gatherings devoted to Poteat's work held by the Polanyi Society, participants concurred that, in contrast to the hypercritical intellectuality typifying modern academic culture, the gatherings exhibited a quality of Post-Critical intellectual life often described and celebrated in Polanyi's writing and underscored by Poteat, namely "conviviality", and that the group exemplified a "convivial order".

During the 1968–69 academic year, Poteat went to Greece (principally Athens) for a sabbatical to study ancient Greek art and culture. Soon after his arrival he happened to encounter the art and subsequently the person of the renowned Greek sculptor Evángelos Moustákas, which occasioned a profound reformation of his thinking and completely disrupted his sabbatical plans. He later characterized this encounter as "an Orphic dismemberment. The intellectual categories upon which I had relied no longer fit. My whole being—my mindbodily being—was riven."

Poteat had long pursued serious study of visual art, drama, and literature, weaving those themes deeply into his teaching. He recognized Moustákas to be an artist whose vibrant roots in Greek culture and mythology seemed completely free of the influence of the Renaissance-Reformation-Enlightenment perspective that he believed had so desiccated Western art. In the spring of 1970 he arranged an exhibition for Moustákas's sculpture and visual art at the Duke University Gallery of Art (8 March to 3 May). The transformation of Poteat's thinking resulting from his encounter with Moustákas and his work culminated in his Polanyian Meditations: In Search of a Post-Critical Logic (1985), its fullest published expression.

In the summer following the Moustákas exhibition, Poteat taught two courses at Stanford University as a visiting professor: "Eroticism, Music, and Madness" and "Religion and Art". The following spring he taught the former course again at the University of Texas at Austin. For three consecutive years in the 1970s he also taught an honors seminar for juniors at UNC-Greensboro. In 1969 Poteat was appointed a member of the National Humanities Faculty. He chaired Duke's Department of Religion from 1972 to 1978.

After his retirement from the Duke faculty in 1987, Poteat continued to supervise a few Ph.D. students and authored two books: A Philosophical Daybook: Post-Critical Investigations (1990) and Recovering the Ground: Critical Exercises in Recollection (1994). In 1993, two former students, James M. Nickell and James W. Stines, edited and provided an introduction to a collection of twenty-three of Poteat's essays, most published between 1953 and 1981, entitled The Primacy of Persons and the Language of Culture. From 1994 to 1999 his wife Patricia Lewis Poteat served as president of Athens College in Greece (a part of the State University of New York system). There he taught courses, without charge, in the college's adult education program.

William H. Poteat died on 17 May 2000. His papers are archived at the Yale Divinity School Library. At the time of his death he was survived by his first wife, Marian Kelley, their three children and three grandchildren; his second wife, Patricia Lewis Poteat; and his two sisters.

In 2014 thirty-three of his former students and other admirers gathered at the Yale Divinity School for a symposium honoring his life and work, called "The Primacy of Persons: The Intellectual Legacy of William H. Poteat" and sponsored by the Polanyi Society. During that event, a sculpture and painting by Evángelos Moustákas relevant to Poteat's teaching were donated to Yale and as of this writing are on exhibit at the Yale Divinity School. (The sculpture, "From Catastrophe to Rebirth", is on display at the school's bookstore, and the painting, "Orpheus and Eurydice", decorates the office of the dean of the school. A website is devoted to this symposium and the donated works of art.)

== Teaching and ideas ==
Prof. William H. Poteat, Duke University, 1970.

To understand what teaching was for William Poteat, it is important to realize what he sought primarily to accomplish—specifically in his teaching, and generally in his intellectual endeavors—according to those most closely associated with him as Ph.D. students. It was no ordinary matter of conveying information and understanding, nor helping his students gain mastery of difficult ideas and texts so that they in turn could be in a position to help their students gain such mastery—although these tasks were unavoidably involved.

His primary aim in teaching was to provoke in his students a fundamental shift in sensibility and perspective from the mode of Critical intellection and reflection that characterizes Modernity and predominates in the academic world, to what he and Michael Polanyi called a Post-Critical mode of thinking. Instead of attending solely to the what of a topic (an item of content, a teaching, a matter to be subjected to intellectual mastery and critique as an indifferent object of thought), the shift involves becoming aware of the how of intellection itself—specifically of the how of one's responsive relationship as person in the world to the object of thought—of how one personally happens to be relating oneself to it. That how of intellection, the how of one's personal relation to the object of thought—in other words, the underlying relationship between knower and known—is predominantly tacit, difficult to articulate, and therefore not something on which one can easily reflect, which causes it to be all the more potentially consequential in the process of knowing.

Poteat and Polanyi understood the Post-Critical mode of thinking to be the essential corrective and natural successor to the Critical approach to thinking and knowing, which tends to lose track of the how of knowing while presuming a relationship of hypercritical suspicion, guarded distance, and objectification for the sake of achieving "objective knowledge," from which personal presence and involvement are withheld or repressed. By presuming personal involvement in the process of knowing to be illegitimate, because it is thought to adulterate the objectivity of what is to be known, features of that knowledge that are the result of personal participation drop out of the resulting conception, including most notably the presence of the subject who is doing the knowing and who is indwelling the context and discerning the facts of that knowing. In their view, the Critical mode of thinking operates under the unacknowledged presumption that only such a depersonalized relationship can result in unadulterated truth. As a consequence, it is for the most part oblivious to the distortions attendant to such an impoverished and reductive relationship.

In its idolization of objectivity, according to Poteat and other Post-Critical philosophers, the Critical perspective tends to lose entirely the contributions to knowing that come only through personal presence, "mindbodily" participation, empathy, caring, thoughtful hospitality, and sensitive and thoughtful interpretation—all aspects of what Poteat and Polanyi refer to as indwelling. Thus the Critical mode by devaluing, and becoming oblivious to, the intimate connections between how and what, and generally to the underlying tacit relationship between knower and known, leaves in its place a colorless, purposeless, meaningless world of objects subject to unchecked manipulation. In Poteat's own words,

it is the perennial temptation of critical thought to demand total explicitness in all things, to bring all background into foreground, to dissolve the tension between the focal and the subsidiary by making everything focal, to dilute the temporal and intentional thickness of perception, to dehistoricize thought ... to lighten every shadowy place, to dig up and aerate the roots of our being, to make all interiors exterior, to unsituate all reflection from time and space, to disincarnate mind, to define knowledge as that which can be grasped by thought in an absolutely lucid 'moment' without temporal extension, to flatten out all epistemic hierarchy, to homogenize all logical heterogeneity

Poteat demonstrated to his students that making the shift to a Post-Critical mode of thinking requires escaping from the largely subconscious and profoundly self-alienating abstractedness of the Critical mode—the "default mode" of Modernity. As one is able to break free, he taught, the way is cleared to be more at one with one's authentic self, more fully present to the authentic selves of others and to the things of the world with which one is concerned. For this to happen, an acute awareness of those self-alienating tendencies and their tragic consequences must be developed. In place of hypercritical suspicion as the driving, central motive of thought, one comes to share in a Post-Critical sensibility, centered on the recovery of a passionate methodological faith in the tacit intimations of reality, a truth in common, that reveals itself inexhaustibly. So also, one's understanding of oneself as knower shifts from the former split (now recognized to be illusionary) between subjective knower as if it were outside the world and depersonalized object of knowledge among objects, to a unified mindbodily knower deeply and richly implicated within the natural and cultural world alongside other persons.

Poteat accomplished this pedagogical feat through a combination of an ironic stance, whereby he deliberately made impossible any simple, straightforward taking in of what he might have to convey, and a skillful use of the Socratic Method to question, draw out, and bring to light the implications of his students' own thoughts and ideas on the text under consideration and the issues it raised.

Poteat typically conducted this process of discovery and reorientation during seminar discussions of certain assigned texts, often in relation to each other. Although other texts were included from time to time, a central core of key texts included Polanyi's Personal Knowledge, Wittgenstein's Philosophical Investigations and On Certainty, Merleau-Ponty's Phenomenology of Perception, Hannah Arendt's The Human Condition, and a selection of Kierkegaard's works, particularly his essay "The Immediate Stages of the Erotic or the Musical Erotic" in Either/Or vol. 1. In those books their authors undertook a radical critique of the "prepossessions of the European Enlightenment concerning the nature of human knowing and doing."

Later in his life he described the principal focus of this teaching effort in the following words:

[It was] a sustained critical colloquy with three generations of graduate students set among a half-dozen or so "canonical" volumes in the context of our mutual search for the imagination's way out of what Walker Percy has called the "old modern age."

I, and my students in the measure to which they have truly joined the colloquy, have from the outset aspired to be radically critical of the Critical tradition of modernity, which is to say, we have undertaken to become postcritical.

Like any parasite, this essentially polemical convivium has battened on its host, hoping, not to weaken and eventually bring down, but, rather, modestly to change the universities in which it was formed and by whose sufferance it has lived. At least those of us who have sustained this colloquy have hoped to be and have changed.

An example of the "profound confusion" Poteat cited in the texts he assigned can be noted in Patricia Lewis Poteat's commentary on Percy in Walker Percy and the Old Modern Age: Reflections on Language, Argument, and the Telling of Stories".: "Percy's conceptual vision becomes progressively more blurred as his style and vocabulary become progressively less anecdotal or narrative and more analytical and abstract—hence ever more tenuously anchored in the concrete particulars of persons in predicaments"; she suggests that in Percy's essays "he often falls victim to the very incoherence of modern philosophy he intends to criticize".

Another example vividly illustrating Poteat's pedagogy comes from Araminta Stone Johnson, self-described as "one of Bill Poteat's 'last' students," in "Thanks For Everything, Poteat!: An Intellectual (But Personal) Autobiography" in the Polanyi Society Journal Tradition and Discovery:

Ricoeur's Freud and Philosophy... is a ponderous tome, and it was the assigned reading for the first class I had with Poteat. ... The "thing" that Ricoeur was doing and that Poteat wanted us to experience, not just "see", was Ricoeur's not-so-latent Cartesianism. Poteat was convinced that in order for us to know something different from the Cartesian water that we swam in, it was necessary for us to struggle and struggle; ... It was only because I had struggled ... with Poteat and my fellow students that I could later see the same pattern in [other works].

Although Poteat drew heavily on that small core of texts for his teaching methodology, particularly at Duke, his teaching ranged over a very wide scope to incorporate most aspects of the history of Western culture, Renaissance visual art, tragedy, ancient Greek culture, the interaction between Greek and Hebrew metaphysics, existentialism, ordinary language philosophy, theory of myth and symbol, religious language, philosophy of science, phenomenology, philosophical psychology, and philosophical anthropology.

In contrast to his close and powerful relationships with students, a fellow professor in Duke's Religion Department whose career there overlapped with Poteat's, Robert Osborn, reports no comparable relationships with his faculty colleagues:

My colleagues and I at Duke University recognized that Bill was an impressive and remarkable man.... He was an attractive person—brilliant, widely read, very charming, even winsome, and a scintillating intellectual. However, he was a mystery. I don’t think any of us in the Department of Religion knew him or began to know him. ... During all the time he was with us—some 27 years ... —we never heard his story. ... He spent little time in the Department precincts except for his meetings with students and for mandated department meetings that he chaired with considerable success. Otherwise he was minimally present. ... He did not attend meetings of the American Academy of Religion, regional or national, even when colleagues were performing. In short he was not really a colleague in the sense that we normally think of a colleague. ... Bill was first and finally a teacher.

== Writing and ideas ==
William Poteat was known to be an original thinker, but also an extraordinarily agile one—in conversation, in teaching, and in writing. Consequently, many of his ideas start with, draw upon, and build upon the ideas of other thinkers, but develop them in ways that might have surprised their originators. As previously indicated, his students were often amazed to discover what was implied and presupposed by their own ideas in ways that might never have come to light had Poteat not drawn them out, usually while withholding his own opinions on the subject to enable his students to develop in their own ways. At times it wasn't clear to the student whether there was a difference between her own ideas and Poteat's.

A similar process was at work when during class discussion and in published writing Poteat presented and explored ideas of Wittgenstein or Polanyi or Merleau-Ponty among many others. Poteat would at times call attention to certain ideas of a particular thinker at one point and their tension or conflict with other ideas of the same thinker at another point, with the comment that (for example) Polanyi evidently did not realize what he was saying, what he meant to say, or what he should have said, and was not being true to his (Polanyi's) deepest insight at this point as he was at the other point. Poteat was extraordinarily alert to ambiguities and nuances in language, and he mentored his students in developing a similar alertness in themselves. Although the awareness of subtle ambiguity facilitates the full comprehension of an idea, it produces the tendency found in many of his published works (and sometimes also in his students' writing) parenthetically to qualify and explain the precise sense of a word or phrase in the midst of an otherwise long and complex sentence, sometimes two or three times in a single convoluted sentence. On the other hand, Poteat often took what he was convinced to be one of these writers' key insights and, appropriating it to himself, drew its implications and developed it far beyond what the original writer made of it—especially evident in his book Polanyian Meditations. Not that he claimed their insight as his own, but rather that he sought by the aid of their insight to achieve a greater understanding of the realities that they sought to articulate and their deeper implications.

One such idea, derived from both Michael Polanyi and Maurice Merleau-Ponty, is Poteat's conception of the mindbody (a term he coined): persons are neither (simply) minds in bodies nor (simply) bodies with minds, especially not in the manner that Descartes conceived of them as extended matter and immaterial consciousness. Instead persons are mindbodies, both minds and bodies at once, one and the same, inextricable in every aspect, such that "mind" and "body" taken separately in reflection are seriously distorting abstractions from the whole person that we are in our pre-reflective state. According to Poteat, one's mindbody is one's place in the world, the "oriented whence" of all of one's activities and the place by means of which, and only in relation to which, all other places and things can make any sense at all. In other words, the mindbody is the sentient, motile, and oriented self—the active center of every person's life. In a very brief review of Poteat's account of the mindbody, David W. Rutledge writes:

Through his own phenomenological examination of his bodily being in thinking, writing, bike-riding, and playing tennis, Poteat reveals the insidious tendency of the critical tradition to make us think of our body as a thing like other things, when in fact it is, for us, radically unlike anything else in the universe. It is the center from which all our stretching forth toward the world commences, beginning:

in my mother’s womb, within which her beating heart rhythmically pumps the blood of life through my foetal body, forming itself toward my primal initiation into the very foundation of my first and most primitive cosmos. ... These forms are for me, even still for conscious, reflective, critical me, archetypically the forms of measured time: tempo, beat, strophe, pulse. ... There is then an archaic prejudice far older than I in my pre-reflective and unreflecting mindbody to indwell all form, meaning, and order in the world as the kindred of the first order I have known, the order of my mother’s beating heart.

The ground of the human notions of order, measure, “connectedness,” of “hanging together” (that is, logic) lies in this prelingual level of awareness, which is inescapably ours, which never leaves us, and from which all the articulations of higher thought are educed. Where else would the human sense of pattern, order, rhythm have come from, if we were not, long before formal reflection, already immersed in a world that gave us meaning?

... it is clear that if the tonic mindbody is the omnipresent and inalienable matrix within which all our acts of meaning-discernment are conceived and brought to term, if, that is to say, the new picture of ourselves as beings in the world actively engaged in asking, seeking, finding, and affirming clearly situates us in the moil and ruck of the world’s temporal thickness, marinating there in our own carnal juices, then our rationality can only appear here, inextricably consanguine with our most primitive sentience, motility, and orientation.

Another of Poteat's significant ideas, touched on in this last quotation, in support of which Poteat's Polanyian Meditations: In Search of a Post-Critical Logic is dedicated, is that all explicitly formal modes of rationality—including logic, mathematics, geometry, and computer processing—along with all of the wonderfully useful things with which they endow us in our technocratic world—are ultimately rooted and grounded in the pre-reflectively lived flesh of our mindbodies in the world—not in any sense as a compromise to their validity but as the enabling power of their meaning and coherence. In Poteat's own words,

I argue therefore that contrary to the subtly pervasive “picture” in the regnant Cartesianism of this culture that conceptually estranges thought about our minds from thought about our bodies, formalized rationality—mathematics and formal logic—derives from and remains parasitical upon the “hanging togetherness” and “sense-making” of our integral mindbodily rootedness in the as yet unreflected world and in our unreflected “thinkings” and doings in that world. This of course means that the mix among our uses of such concepts as ‘reason,’ ‘logic,’ ‘body,’ and ‘mind,’ to mention only some, will come to be drastically revised.

Among the most significant ideas that Poteat made his own, starting with an idea of another thinker, is the concept of the Post-Critical, which has already been discussed several times in this article. The phrase, "Post-Critical," Poteat drew directly from Michael Polanyi’s Personal Knowledge: Towards a Post-Critical Philosophy (1958), but Poteat discovered that what Polanyi meant by it was substantially akin to shifts in thinking advocated under other names by other philosophical critics of modern intellectual culture—specifically, critics of the Critical mode of thinking that has come to dominate that culture, particularly in the Academy. Chief among these critics for Poteat, in addition to Polanyi, were Pascal, Kierkegaard, Wittgenstein, Merleau-Ponty, and Arendt. In different ways, all sought to move beyond and break with the "Critical" intellectual sensibility that has defined intellectual thinking since the Enlightenment period. As articulated originally by René Descartes, the Critical mode of inquiry seeks to arrive at the undistorted truth by filtering one's encounter with reality through a lens of extreme suspicion and doubt—specifically toward each and every candidate for belief to require that it be rendered clearly and distinctly explicit and therewith prove itself to be undoubtedly before granting it credence. This, of course, calls into question all things taken for granted unreflectively, all things passed on from tradition, all things held as a matter of faith, the deliverances of our sense experience, and commonsense judgments—especially things uncertain, indefinite, or non-explicit. Since its emergence as the predominant epistemic paradigm of the modern era and taken to be the central component of the method of modern science, the Critical mode has been assailed by many of the thinkers mentioned previously, but especially by Polanyi, for breeding a pervasive skepticism toward higher-order realities and ideals, and all meanings and alleged realities traditionally associated with the arts and the humanities. As a result, with inherent meaning, purpose, and value thus filtered out of what is allowed to make up objective reality, surviving only as apparently baseless projections of human subjectivity, it is no wonder that great numbers of people within our culture have suffered and continue to suffer from rootlessness, nihilism, and despair.

In the view of Poteat and Polanyi, Post-Critical designates a shift from this Critical mode to a profound recognition of something quite different at the heart of all genuine intellectual inquiry, something unrecognized and unrecognizable by the Critical mode. In place of suspicion and doubt, there is a tacit methodological faith—which is to say, an intellectual passion—to discover truth and make sense of things. To recognize and embrace this shift, Poteat realized that it requires not only an intellectual breakthrough but an existential transformation: from a detached, withdrawn, and withheld faith and passion to a pouring forth of one's personal presence, empathy, and creative powers, actively reaching out to apprehend and indwell intimations of truth and yet undisclosed realities in whatever field of inquiry.

One of the distinctive philosophical methodologies employed by Poteat in his teaching and particularly in his later writing is closely akin to what some writers (especially Merleau-Ponty in his Phenomenology of Perception) have called "existential phenomenology" or just phenomenology. Poteat recognized in Merleau-Ponty's practice of existential phenomenology a means of appropriating existentially Edmund Husserl’s shift from what Husserl called "the Natural Standpoint" (a third-person abstractive account of the supposedly objective world of material objects, our body supposedly being one of them) to a confident embracing of the concrete, pre-reflective "Lifeworld" that we know only from within our lived body. Existential phenomenology, for Merleau-Ponty, is the way that the wonders of the Lifeworld can be adequately described and understood as more fundamental than any abstract conceptions deriving from the Natural Standpoint. Poteat recognized in this shift or transition in Merleau-Ponty via the practice of existential phenomenology as another instance of the shift from the Critical to the Post-Critical. Rather than pursuing this methodology systematically, as some phenomenologists have attempted to do, in Poteat's teaching and writing he describes and brings to our notice normally tacit aspects of our mindbodily being in the world of which we are usually not reflectively aware or able to articulate. It is the very abstractedness of our usual patterns of thinking and our habituated modern fixation upon only what can be made explicit that keep us unaware of such aspects of experience, without which reality as a whole cannot be apprehended nor experience be comprehended. Poteat seeks to have us awaken to those tacit aspects and then appropriate them as extensions of ourselves, grounding us reflectively in our own mindbodily being in the world. In Polanyian Meditations, Poteat explicitly characterizes his method as “reflexive phenomenology.”

Others among Poteat's principal ideas include:

- The dialectic of self-absence and self-presence.
- Recovering, and responsibly owning up to, oneself as incarnate person among persons (linking profoundly with key emphases in Christian and Jewish existentialism and their roots in the traditions of spirituality at their source).
- The fact that human beings are not merely animals with a gift for language (first of all and primarily speech), but that as persons we come into being and realize ourselves [through] language (as speech).
- The resources of reflexive self-reference in language, particularly the first-person singular nominative pronoun "I" and other reflexive pronouns that are the paradigmatic means of identifying and owning up to the tacit personal presence and center of responsibility that we are.
- The "metaphorical intentionalities" of the words and gestures of our culture that extend our mindbodily powers to make reflective sense of our experience yet simultaneously render us captive to specific ways they construe the world and ourselves within it—captivating us within a "picture," as in Wittgenstein's phrase: "a picture held us captive."
- Concrete places and the "here" of one's mindbody, experienced pre-reflectively, versus modernity's abstract, homogenized space and spatial location.
- Concrete temporality (with the manifold particular "pretensions" and "retrotensions" of one's temporal being) and the shifting present moment of one's mindbody, experienced pre-reflectively, versus modernity's abstract, homogenized clock-time.
- The increasing dominance in our culture of the visual sensorium (versus, specifically, the auditory sensorium) with its tendency to objectify and exteriorize our sensibility, prevailing since the advent of Renaissance art and the culture of print and literacy.
- Western culture being ever in unstable yet creative tension between key metaphors deriving from Hellenic (ancient Greek) culture on the one hand and from ancient Hebrew culture on the other.
- Poteat had much to say by way of a humanistic, as opposed to a scientistic, understanding, assessment and justification of Freudian Psychoanalysis.
- Poteat also contributed illuminating insights into the nature of art, especially the visual art of Paul Cézanne, as a post-critical way into doing fundamental ontology.

== Works ==
- The Primacy of Persons and the Language of Culture: Essays by William H. Poteat, edited by James M. Nickell and James W. Stines (Columbia, MO: University of Missouri Press, 1993). (Collection of essays published by Poteat between 1953 and 1981, along with some unpublished essays.)
- Intellect and Hope: Essays on the Thought of Michael Polanyi, edited by Thomas A. Langford and William H. Poteat (Durham, NC: Duke University Press, 1968). Poteat is the author of three of the essays included in this volume: "Upon Sitting Down to Read Personal Knowledge...: An Introduction", pp. 3–18; "Myths, Stories, History, Eschatology and Action: Some Polanyian Meditations", pp. 198–231, and "Appendix", pp. 449–455, which explains Polanyi's unusual use of the concept "unspecifiable" in connection with his account of tacit knowledge.
- Polanyian Meditations: In Search of a Post-Critical Logic (Durham, NC: Duke University Press, 1985).
- A Philosophical Daybook: Post-Critical Investigations (Columbia, MO: University of Missouri Press, 1990).
- Recovering the Ground: Critical Exercises in Recollection (Albany, NY: State University of New York Press, 1994).
- "Paul Cézanne and the Numinous Power of the Real" in Recovering the Personal: The Philosophical Anthropology of William H. Poteat, edited by Dale W. Cannon and Ronald L. Hall (Lanham, MD: Lexington Press, 2016), 187–204.

== See also ==
- Post-Critical
