= Verisimilitude =

Resemblance to reality

In philosophy, verisimilitude (or truthlikeness) is the notion that some propositions are closer to being true than other propositions. The problem of verisimilitude is the problem of articulating what it takes for one false theory to be closer to the truth than another false theory.

This problem was central to the philosophy of Karl Popper, largely because Popper was among the first to affirm that truth is the aim of scientific inquiry while acknowledging that most of the greatest scientific theories in the history of science are, strictly speaking, false. If this long string of purportedly false theories is to constitute progress with respect to the goal of truth, then it must be at least possible for one false theory to be closer to the truth than others.

== Karl Popper ==
Popper's formal definition of verisimilitude was challenged since 1974 by Pavel Tichý, John Henry Harris, and David Miller, who argued that Popper's definition has an unintended consequence: that no false theory can be closer to the truth than another. Popper himself stated: "I accepted the criticism of my definition within minutes of its presentation, wondering why I had not seen the mistake before." This result gave rise to a search for an account of verisimilitude that did not deem progress towards the truth an impossibility.

== Post-Popperian theories ==
Theories proposed by David Miller and by Theo Kuipers build on Popper's approach, guided by the notion that truthlikeness is a function of a truth factor and a content factor. Others (e.g. those advanced by Gerhard Schurz in collaboration with Paul Weingartner, by Mortensen, and by Ken Gemes) are also inspired by Popper's approach but locate what they believe to be the error of Popper's proposal in his overly generous notion of content, or consequence, proposing instead that the consequences that contribute to closeness to truth must be, in a technical sense, "relevant". A different approach (already proposed by Tichý and Risto Hilpinen and developed especially by Ilkka Niiniluoto and Graham Oddie) takes the "likeness" in truthlikeness literally, holding that a proposition's likeness to the truth is a function of the overall likeness to the actual world of the possible worlds in which the proposition would be true. An attempt to use the notion of point-free metric space is proposed by Giangiacomo Gerla. There is currently a debate about whether or to what extent these different approaches to the concept are compatible.

== See also ==
- AI Trust Paradox
- Imagination
- McNamara fallacy
- Truthiness
- Verificationism
