= Polanyi's paradox =

Philosophical theory

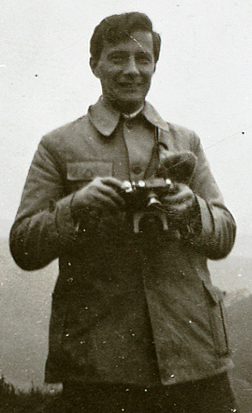
Professor Michael Polanyi on a hike in England

Polanyi's paradox, named in honour of the British-Hungarian philosopher Michael Polanyi, is the theory that human knowledge of how the world functions and of our own capability are, to a large extent, beyond our explicit understanding. The theory was articulated by Michael Polanyi in his book The Tacit Dimension in 1966, and economist David Autor gave it a name in his 2014 research paper "Polanyi's Paradox and the Shape of Employment Growth".

Summarised in the slogan "We can know more than we can tell", Polanyi's paradox is mainly to explain the cognitive phenomenon that there exist many tasks which we, human beings, understand intuitively how to perform but cannot verbalize their rules or procedures.

This "self-ignorance" is common to many human activities, from driving a car in traffic to face recognition. As Polanyi argues, humans are relying on their tacit knowledge, which is difficult to adequately express by verbal means, when engaging these tasks. Polanyi's paradox has been widely considered to identify a major obstacle in the fields of AI and automation, since programming an automated task or system is difficult unless a complete and fully specific description of the procedure is available.

== Origins ==
British-Hungarian philosopher Michael Polanyi regularly studied the causes behind human ability to acquire knowledge that they cannot explain through logical deduction. In his work The Tacit Dimension (1966), Polanyi explored the 'tacit' dimension to human knowledge and developed the concept of "tacit knowledge", as opposed to the term "explicit knowledge".

Tacit knowledge can be defined as knowledge people learn from experiences and internalize unconsciously, which is therefore difficult to articulate and codify it in a tangible form. Explicit knowledge, the opposite of tacit knowledge, is knowledge that can be readily verbalized and formalized. Tacit knowledge is largely acquired through implicit learning, the process by which information is learned independently of the subjects' awareness. For example, native speakers tacitly acquire their language in early childhood without consciously studying specific grammar rules (explicit knowledge), but with extensive exposure to day-to-day communication. Besides, people can only limitedly transfer their tacit knowledge through close interactions (sharing experiences with one another or observing others' behaviors). A certain level of trust needs to be established between individuals to capture tacit knowledge.

Tacit knowledge comprises a range of conceptual and sensory information that is featured with strong personal subjectivity. It is implicitly reflected in human actions; as argued by Polanyi, "tacit knowledge dwells in our awareness". People's skills, experiences, insight, creativity and judgement all fall into this dimension. Tacit knowledge can also be described as know-how, distinguishing from know-that or facts. Before Polanyi, Gilbert Ryle published a paper in 1945 drawing the distinction between knowing-that (knowledge of proposition) and knowing-how. According to Ryle, this know-how knowledge is the instinctive and intrinsic knowledge ingrained in the individual's human capability.

Since tacit knowledge cannot be stated in propositional or formal form, Polanyi concludes such inability in articulation in the slogan ‘We can know more than we can tell’. Daily activities based on tacit knowledge include recognizing a face, driving a car, riding a bike, writing a persuasive paragraph, developing a hypothesis to explain a poorly understood phenomenon. Take facial recognition as an illustration: we can recognize our acquaintance's face out of a million others while we are not conscious about the knowledge of his face. It would be difficult for us to describe the precise arrangement of his eyes, nose and mouth, since we memorize the face unconsciously.

As a prelude to The Tacit Dimension, in his book Personal Knowledge (1958), Polanyi claims that all knowing is personal, emphasizing the profound effects of personal feelings and commitments on the practice of science and knowledge. Arguing against the then dominant Empiricists view that minds and experiences are reducible to sense data and collections of rules, he advocates a post-positivist approach that recognizes human knowledge is often beyond their explicit expression. Any attempt to specify tacit knowing only leads to self-evident axioms that cannot tell us why we should accept them.

== Implications ==
Polanyi's observation has deep implications in the AI field since the paradox he identified that "our tacit knowledge of how the world works often exceeds our explicit understanding" accounts for many of the challenges for computerization and automation over the past five decades. Automation requires high levels of exactness to inform the computer what is supposed to be done while tacit knowledge cannot be conveyed in a propositional form. Therefore, machines cannot provide successful outcomes in many cases: they have explicit knowledge (raw data) but nevertheless, do not know how to use such knowledge to understand the task as whole. This discrepancy between human reasoning and AI learning algorithms makes it difficult to automate tasks that demand common sense, flexibility, adaptability and judgment — human intuitive knowledge.

MIT economist David Autor is one of the leading sceptics who doubt the prospects for machine intelligence. Despite the exponential growth in computational resources and the relentless pace of automation since the 1990s, Autor argues, Polanyi's paradox impedes modern algorithms to replace human labor in a range of skilled jobs. The extent of machine substitution of human labor, therefore, has been overestimated by journalists and expert commentators. Although contemporary computer science strives for prevailing over Polanyi's paradox, the ever-changing, unstructured nature of some activities currently presents intimidating challenges for automation. Despite years of time and billions of investment spent on the development of self-driving cars and cleaning robots, these machine learning systems continue to struggle with their low adaptability and interpretability, from self-driving cars' inability to make an unexpected detour to cleaning robots' vulnerability to unmonitored pets or kids. Instead, to let self-driving cars function optimally, we have to change current road infrastructure significantly, minimizing the need for human capabilities in the whole driving process.

The increasing occupational polarisation in the past few decades —the growth of both high-paid, high-skill abstract jobs and lower-paid, low-skill manual jobs — has been a manifestation of Polanyi's paradox. According to Autor, there are two types of tasks proven stubbornly challenging for artificial intelligence (AI): abstract tasks that require problem-solving capabilities, intuition, creativity and persuasion on the one hand, and manual tasks demanding situational adaptability, visual recognition, language understanding, and in-person interactions on the other. Abstract tasks are characteristic of professional, managerial, and technical occupations, while service and laborer occupations involve many manual tasks (e.g. cleaning, lifting and throwing). These jobs tend to be complemented by machines rather than substituted.

By contrast, as the price of computing power declines, computers extensively substitute for routine tasks that can be codified into clear sets of instructions, resulting in a dramatical decline in employment of routine task-intensive jobs. This polarization has resulted in a shrinking middle class across industrialized economies since many middle-income occupations in sales, office and administrative work and repetitive production work are task-intensive. Moreover, the subsequent growth in income inequality and wealth disparity has recently emerged as a major socio-economic issue in developed countries.

== Criticism ==
Some technological optimists argue that recent advances in machine learning have overcome Polanyi's paradox. Instead of relying on programmer’s algorithms to instruct them in human knowledge, computer systems are now able to learn tacit rules from context, abundant data, and applied statistics on their own. Since machines can infer the tacit knowledge that human beings draw upon from examples without human assistance, they are no longer limited by those rules tacitly applied but not explicitly understood by humans.

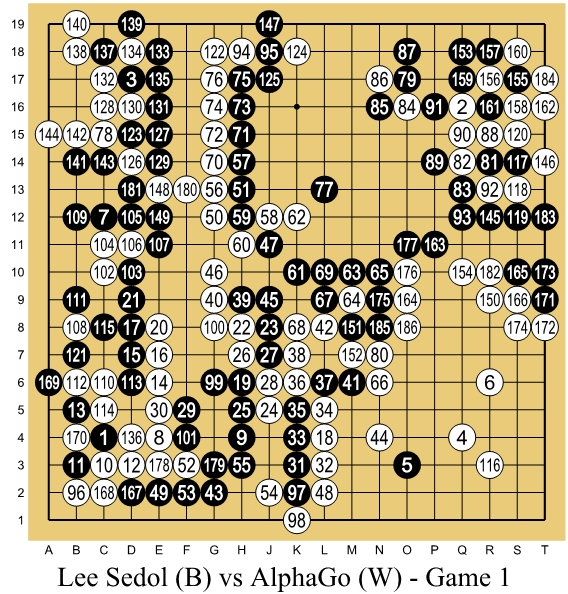
Lee Sedol (B) vs AlphaGo (W) - Game 1

AlphaGo program built by the Google subsidiary DeepMind is an example of how advances in AI have allowed mindless machines to perform very well in tasks based on tacit knowledge. In the 2016 tournament of the strategy game Go, DeepMind's AlphaGo program successfully defeated one of the world's top GO players, Lee Se-dol, four games to one. DeepMind team employed an approach known as deep learning to build human-type judgment into AI systems; such a system can figure out complex winning strategies by analyzing large amounts of data from previous Go matches.

On the other hand, as Carr argues, the assumption that computers need to be able to reproduce the tacit knowledge humans would apply to perform complicated tasks is itself open to doubt. When performing tasks, it is not at all necessary for systems and machines to follow the rules that human beings follow. The goal in having a machine perform a task is to replicate our outcomes for practical purposes, rather than our means.

Jerry Kaplan, a Silicon Valley entrepreneur and AI expert, also illustrates this point in his book Humans Need Not Apply by discussing four resources and capabilities required to accomplish any given task: awareness, energy, reasoning and means. Humans' biological system (the brain-body complex) naturally integrates all these four properties, while in the electronic domain machines can be given these abilities by developments in robotics, machine learning, and perception powering systems. For example, data provided by a wide network of sensors enable AI to perceive various aspects of the environment and respond instantly in chaotic and complex real-world situations (i.e. awareness); orders and signals for actuating devices can be centralised and managed in server clusters or on the 'cloud' (reasoning). Kaplan's argument directly supports the proposition that Polanyi's paradox can no longer impede further levels of automation, whether in performing routine jobs or manual jobs. As Kaplan puts it, "Automation is blind to the colour of your collar."

One example confirms Kaplan's argument is the introduction of Cloud AutoML, an automated system that could help every business design AI software, by Google Brain AI research group in 2017. The learning algorithms of AutoML automates the process of building machine-learning models that can take on a particular task, aiming to democratize AI to the largest possible community of developers and businesses. According to Google’s CEO, Cloud AutoML has taken over some of the work of programmers (which is, in the words of Autor, "abstract task") and thereby offered one solution to the shortage in machine-learning experts.

== Related theories ==
=== Moravec's paradox ===
Moravec’s paradox claims that compared with sophisticated tasks demanding high-level reasoning, it is harder for computers to master low-level physical and cognitive skills that are natural and easy for humans to perform. Examples include natural language processing and dextrous physical movements (e.g. running over rough terrain).

Robotics experts have, accordingly, found it difficult to automate the skills of even the least-trained manual worker, since these jobs require perception and mobility (tacit knowledge). In the words of the cognitive scientist Steven Pinker from his book The Language Instinct, "The main lesson of thirty-five years of AI research is that the hard problems are easy and the easy problems are hard."

Corresponding to David Autor's discussion on jobs polarization, Pinker maintains that the appearance of the new generation's intelligent machines would place stock analysts, petrochemical engineers and parole board members in danger of being replaced. Gardeners, receptionists, and cooks are, by contrast, currently secure.

=== Plato's Problem ===
Plato's Problem is the term given by Noam Chomsky to "the problem of explaining how we can know so much" given our limited experience.

=== Poverty of the stimulus (POS) ===
Poverty of the stimulus (POS) is the argument from linguistics that children are not exposed to rich enough data within their linguistic environments to acquire every feature of their language.

=== Meno’s Paradox ===
Meno’s Paradox can be formulated as follows:

1. If you know what you’re looking for, inquiry is unnecessary.
2. If you don’t know what you’re looking for, inquiry is impossible.
3. Therefore, inquiry is either unnecessary or impossible.

There is within these arguments an implicit premise that either you know what you’re looking for or you don’t know what you’re looking for.

=== The Learning Paradox ===
The Learning Paradox (Fodor 1980) holds that knowledge can either not be new, or not be learned. If new knowledge can be expressed in terms of old knowledge, it is not new. If it cannot be expressed in terms of old knowledge, it cannot be understood. Therefore, learning something genuinely novel is impossible and all essential structures must be present at birth.
