= Post-critical =

Philosophical concept

Post-critical is a term coined by scientist-philosopher Michael Polanyi (1891–1976) in the 1950s to designate a position beyond the critical philosophical orientation (or intellectual sensibility). In this context, "the critical mode" designates a way of relating to reality that was initiated in the years preceding the Enlightenment period and since then has become the predominant intellectual mode of Modernity. (See below.) Polanyi's ideas in this regard were extended in the 1960s and thereafter by William H. Poteat (1919–2000), drawing upon and combining in new ways certain ideas of seminal critics of culture since the Enlightenment such as Pascal, Kierkegaard, Arendt, Wittgenstein (later works), and Merleau-Ponty. Those ideas were further extended by several of Poteat's students and by other members of the Polanyi Society.

As articulated originally by René Descartes, and named much later, the critical mode of inquiry seeks to arrive at the undistorted truth by filtering one's encounter with reality through a lens of extreme suspicion and doubt. Since its emergence as the predominant epistemic paradigm of Modernity, the critical mode has been assailed by many thinkers, including those mentioned previously, for breeding a pervasive skepticism toward higher-order realities and ideals that contributes to an attitude of rootlessness, nihilism, and despair by disparaging meaning, purpose, and value so that they function only as arbitrary or evolved creations of the human mind. Those critics have noted the resulting idolization of reductionistic objectivity to such an extent as to naively overlook the presence of the observer from the observation, and to devalue subjective experience (as opposed to behavior) as a scientific concern.

Advocates of post-critical philosophy assert that the critical perspective, in its idolization of objectivity, tends to lose entirely the dimension of knowing that becomes available only through personal presence, "mindbodily" participation, empathy, caring, and thoughtful hospitality – all aspects of the profoundly personal phenomenon that Poteat and Polanyi refer to as indwelling. Their critique maintains that the critical mode devalues the sensitive and respectful interpretation that takes into account not only the relationship of what and how, but also the relationship of the knower and the known, leaving in its place a colorless, purposeless, meaningless, and exceedingly incomplete world of impersonal objects subject to unchecked manipulation. Further, by judging personal involvement in the process of knowing to be illegitimate, because it adulterates the objectivity of what is to be known, certain inherently personal features of that knowledge are abstracted, including most absurdly the presence of the subject who is doing the knowing, and who is indwelling the context and facts of that knowing. In their view, the critical mode of thinking operates under the unacknowledged presumption that only such a depersonalized relationship can result in unadulterated truth. As a consequence it is for the most part oblivious to the distortions attendant to such an impoverished and reductive relationship.

In the view of both Poteat and Polanyi, the term post-critical (as distinct from postmodern) designates a shift to a profound recognition of something quite different that is unrecognizable by the "critical" sensibility, yet vital to all genuine intellectual inquiry: a tacit methodological faith accompanied by an intellectual passion to discover truth and make sense of one's perceptions. To recognize and embrace this truth, Poteat claimed, requires not only an intellectual breakthrough but an existential transformation: from a detached, withdrawn attitude and withheld faith and passion to a pouring forth of one's personal presence, empathy, and creative powers into whatever field of inquiry beckons — actively reaching out to apprehend and indwell yet-undisclosed intimations of truth and reality.

Instead of attending solely to the what of a topic (an item of content, a teaching, a matter to be subjected to intellectual mastery and critique as an indifferent object of thought), the shift to the post-critical perspective results in an awakening to a continuous awareness of the how of experience – specifically to the how of one's responsive relationship as a person in the world to that experience – to how one happens to be relating oneself to it. That how awareness is predominantly tacit and not articulable within one's mental monologue or otherwise, which causes it to be all the more potentially consequential to the process of knowing.

Poteat and Polanyi taught that moving beyond what they deemed the profoundly flawed mode of critical intellection and reflection that characterizes Modernity and predominates in the academic world requires a fundamental shift in sensibility and perspective to what they call a post-critical mode of being in the world. They understood the post-critical shift to be the essential antidote and natural successor to the critical approach to knowing and its tendency to lose track of the how of knowing while presuming a relationship of critical suspicion, guarded distance, and objectification to achieve "objective knowledge" from which personal presence and involvement are withheld.

An idea integral to Poteat's articulation of Post-critical philosophy, derived especially from Maurice Merleau-Ponty, is the mindbody (a term he coined): persons are neither (simply) minds in bodies nor (simply) bodies with minds, especially not in the discrete form conceived by Descartes. Instead persons are mindbodies, both minds and bodies at once, one and the same, inextricable in every aspect, such that "mind" and "body" taken separately are seriously distorting abstractions from the whole person. According to Poteat, one's mindbody is one's place in the world, the "oriented whence" of all of one's activities and the place by means of which, and only in relation to which, all other places and things can make any sense at all. In other words, the mindbody is the sentient, motile, and oriented self – the active center of every person's life.

== History ==
Polanyi presented the post-critical concept in his 1951-52 Gifford Lectures, which he revised and published as his magnum opus, Personal Knowledge: Towards a Post-Critical Philosophy (1958). It was while writing Personal Knowledge that he extended the post-critical idea by defining the "structure of tacit knowing" in which experience includes a subsidiary awareness by which one's focal awareness is accomplished, presenting the result in his October 1962 Terry Lectures, published as The Tacit Dimension (1966). He had largely completed its development when William H. Poteat brought him to Duke University to deliver the Duke Lectures for the 1964–65 academic year, entitled "Man in Thought".

Poteat had met Polanyi in Manchester during a visit to the UK in 1955, receiving from him a typescript of Polanyi's Gifford Lectures. He had first encountered Polanyi's writing in 1952 through an essay called "The Stability of Beliefs" in the British Journal for the Philosophy of Science, which was incorporated into Personal Knowledge. Poteat reflected on his initial encounter with Polanyi's work as having "accredited and greatly enriched the context within which initially to obey my own intimations."

Poteat's first use of the term post-critical occurred in his teaching and conversation beginning with his first exposure to Polanyi's usage of the phrase in the mid-1950s. His first published use of post-critical appears to be in "Moustákas Within His Ambience" in Faith and Art 1:4 (1973), republished in The Primacy of Persons and the Language of Culture: Essays by William H. Poteat (1993). His fullest published discussion is in his book Polanyian Meditations: In Search of a Post-Critical Logic Over the years he sometimes used it with the hyphen ("post-critical"), sometimes without.

Prior to his encounter with Polanyi in 1955 Poteat had already a general idea of how to move beyond the critical mode, articulating it in a variety of terms and phrases. Soon after that encounter, he discovered in Polanyi's lectures, and then in his magnum opus Personal Knowledge: Towards a Post-Critical Philosophy, that the term post-critical most accurately named and defined the necessary shift he perceived necessary to progress beyond the critical sensibility that has defined intellectual thinking since the Enlightenment period.

Poteat employed a particular pedagogical approach to initiate this post-critical shift in his students that combined an ironic stance, whereby he deliberately made impossible any simple, straightforward taking in of what he might have to convey, with a skillful use of the Socratic method to question, draw out, and bring to light the implications of his students' own thoughts and ideas on the text under consideration and the issues it raised. A close friend and later a colleague at UNC-Chapel Hill, Ruel Tyson, spoke of him as "the most consistent, most unrelenting practitioner of Socratic dialectic of any teacher I have had or known in over 65 years in the classroom as student and teacher." Poteat typically conducted this process of discovery and reorientation during seminar discussions about assigned texts. Along with Polanyi's Personal Knowledge and his own Polanyian Meditations, such texts included Ricœur's Freud and Philosophy: An Essay on Interpretation, Wittgenstein's Philosophical Investigations and On Certainty, Merleau-Ponty's Phenomenology of Perception, Hannah Arendt's The Human Condition, and Kierkegaard's works, particularly his essay "The Immediate Stages of the Erotic or the Musical Erotic" in Either/Or vol. 1. In those books their authors undertook a radical critique of the "prepossessions of the European Enlightenment concerning the nature of human knowing and doing." In those texts, according to Poteat,

"modern culture... is under the maximum radical pressure from the author [who]..., therefore, most vividly discloses – sometimes wittingly but more often unwittingly – the repertoire of concepts in which both we and the author are immured. Usually these are profoundly confused books, for no author is so likely edifyingly to exhibit his or her embranglement in those very destructive conceptual dualisms which define Modernity as when he or she undertakes to bring them explicitly under attack."

A testimony vividly illustrating Poteat's pedagogical approach comes from Araminta Stone Johnson, self-described as "one of Bill Poteat's 'last' students', in "Thanks For Everything, Poteat!: An Intellectual (But Personal) Autobiography" in the Polanyi Society Journal Tradition and Discovery.:

Ricoeur's Freud and Philosophy... is a ponderous tome, and it was the assigned reading for the first class I had with Poteat. ... The "thing" that Ricouer was doing and that Poteat wanted us to experience, not just "see", was Ricoeur's not-so-latent Cartesianism. Poteat was convinced that in order for us to know something different from the Cartesian water that we swam in, it was necessary for us to struggle and struggle; ... It was only because I had struggled ... with Poteat and my fellow students that I could later see the same pattern in [other works].

Later in his life he described the principal focus of this teaching effort in the following words:

[It was] a sustained critical colloquy with three generations of graduate students set among a half-dozen or so "canonical" volumes in the context of our mutual search for the imagination's way out of what Walker Percy has called the 'old modern age.'

I, and my students in the measure to which they have truly joined the colloquy, have from the outset aspired to be radically critical of the Critical tradition of Modernity, which is to say, we have undertaken to become Post-Critical.

Like any parasite, this essentially polemical convivium has battened on its host, hoping, not to weaken and eventually bring down, but, rather, modestly to change the universities in which it was formed and by whose sufferance it has lived. At least those of us who have sustained this colloquy have hoped to be and have changed.
