= Harry Prosch =

American philosopher

Harry Prosch (May 4, 1917 – March 11, 2005) was an American philosopher born in Logansport, Indiana.

== Life ==
Prosch, the son of a grocer, was told he was ineligible to enter college because he had not studied Latin. "He was placed in the Industrial Arts program from which he graduated in 1935 and became an apprentice pattern-maker at a machine company where he worked for several years." He joined the army in 1942 and served in the Pacific in New Guinea and the Philippines as a supply sergeant.

Prosch collaborated with Michael Polanyi on several philosophical papers including Meaning, published in 1975. His book Michael Polanyi: A Critical Exposition was published in 1986.

== Bibliography ==
- Polanyi, Michael; Prosch, Harry (1975). Meaning. Chicago: University of Chicago Press. ISBN 0-226-67294-8.
- The Genesis of Twentieth Century Philosophy: The Evolution of thought from Copernicus to the Present. Garden City, New York: Doubleday and Company. 1964.
- Michael Polanyi: A Critical Exposition. Albany, NY: State University of New York Press. 1986.

== See also ==
- American philosophy
- List of American philosophers
