= Michael Polanyi =

Hungarian-British polymath (1891–1976)

Michael Polanyi FRS
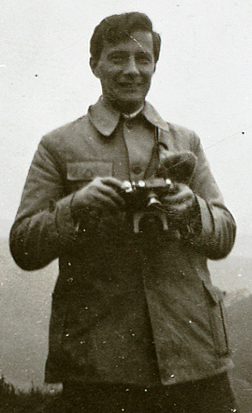
- Polanyi in England, 1933
- Born: Pollacsek Mihály; 11 March 1891; Budapest, Austria-Hungary
- Died: 22 February 1976 (aged 84); Northampton, England
- Education: Technische Hochschule; University of Budapest
- Known for: Polanyi's paradox Polanyi's sphere Polanyi potential theory Bell–Evans–Polanyi principle Eyring–Polanyi equation Flow plasticity theory Transition state theory Harpoon reaction Tacit knowledge Post-critical
- Spouse: Magda Kemeny
- Children: 2, including John
- Relatives: Karl Polanyi (brother); Kari Polanyi Levitt (niece); Eva Zeisel (niece); Ilona Duczynska (sister-in-law)
- Awards: Gifford Lectures (1951–1952); Fellow of the Royal Society (1944)
- Scientific career
- Fields: Physical chemistry Economics; Philosophy
- Workplaces: Kaiser Wilhelm Institute; University of Manchester; Merton College, Oxford
- Thesis: Adsorption of Gases by a Solid Non-Volatile Adsorbent (1917)
- Doctoral advisor: Gusztáv Buchböck

Michael Polanyi (/poʊˈlænji/ poh-LAN-yee; Hungarian: Polányi Mihály; 11 March 1891 – 22 February 1976) was a Hungarian-British polymath active as a physical chemist, philosopher and physician, contributing to fields including materials science, thermodynamics, theoretical biology, economics, sociology, psychology and philosophy of science. Polanyi argued that positivism is a false account of knowing.

His wide-ranging research in physical science included chemical kinetics, x-ray diffraction, and adsorption of gases. He pioneered the theory of fibre diffraction analysis in 1921, and the dislocation theory of plastic deformation of ductile metals and other materials in 1934. He emigrated to Germany, in 1926 becoming a chemistry professor at the Kaiser Wilhelm Institute in Berlin, and then in 1933 to England, becoming first a chemistry professor, and then a social sciences professor at the University of Manchester. Two of his students won the Nobel Prize, as did his son. In 1944 Polanyi was elected to the Royal Society.

The contributions which Polanyi made to the social sciences include the concept of a polycentric spontaneous order and his rejection of a value neutral conception of liberty. They were developed in the context of his opposition to central planning.

== Life ==
=== Early life ===
Polanyi, born Mihály Pollacsek in Budapest, was the fifth child of Mihály and Cecília Pollacsek (born as Cecília Wohl), secular Jews from Ungvár (then in Hungary but now in Ukraine) and Wilno, then Russian Empire, respectively. His father's family were entrepreneurs, while his mother's father, Osher Leyzerovich Vol, was the senior teacher of Jewish history at the Vilna rabbinic seminary. The family moved to Budapest and Magyarized their surname to Polányi. His father built much of the Hungarian railway system, but lost most of his fortune in 1899 when bad weather caused a railway building project to go over budget. He died in 1905. Cecília Polányi established a salon that was well known among Budapest's intellectuals, and which continued until her death in 1939. His older brother was Karl Polanyi, the political economist and anthropologist, and his niece was Eva Zeisel, a world-renowned ceramist.

=== Education ===
In 1908, Polanyi graduated the teacher-training secondary school, the Minta Gymnasium. He then studied medicine at the University of Budapest, obtaining his medical diploma in 1914. He was an active member of the Galileo Circle. With the support of Ignác Pfeifer, professor of chemistry at the Royal Joseph University of Budapest, he obtained a scholarship to study chemistry at the Technische Hochschule in Karlsruhe, Germany. In the First World War, he served in the Austro-Hungarian army as a medical officer, and was sent to the Serbian front. While on sick-leave in 1916, he wrote a PhD thesis on adsorption. His research was encouraged by Albert Einstein and supervised by Gusztáv Buchböck, and in 1919 the Royal University of Pest awarded him a doctorate.

=== Career ===
In October 1918, Mihály Károlyi established the Hungarian Democratic Republic, and Polanyi became Secretary to the Minister of Health. When the Communists seized power in March 1919, he returned to medicine. When the Hungarian Soviet Republic was overthrown, Polanyi emigrated to Karlsruhe in Germany, and was invited by Fritz Haber to join the Kaiser Wilhelm Institut für Faserstoffchemie (fiber chemistry) in Berlin. A Christian since 1913, in a Roman Catholic ceremony he married Magda Elizabeth Kemeny. In 1926 he became the professorial head of department of the Institut für Physikalische Chemie und Elektrochemie (now the Fritz Haber Institute). In 1929, Magda gave birth to their son John, who was awarded a Nobel Prize in chemistry in 1986. Their other son, George Polanyi, who predeceased him, became a well-known economist.

His experience of runaway inflation and high unemployment in Weimar Germany led Polanyi to become interested in economics. With the coming to power in 1933 of the Nazi party, he accepted a chair in physical chemistry at the University of Manchester. Whilst there he was elected to membership of the Manchester Literary and Philosophical Society in 1934. Two of his pupils, Eugene Wigner and Melvin Calvin, went on to win the Nobel Prize. Because of his increasing interest in the social sciences, Manchester University created a new chair in Social Science (1948–58) for him.

Polanyi was among the 2,300 names of prominent persons listed on the Nazis' Special Search List, of those who were to be arrested on the invasion of Great Britain and turned over to the Gestapo.

From June 1944 to 1947, Polanyi participated in the activities of The Moot, a Christian discussion circle concerned with shaping the post-war society, at the invitation of Karl Mannheim and J. H. Oldham.

In 1944 Polanyi was elected a member of the Royal Society, and on his retirement from the University of Manchester in 1958 he was elected a senior research fellow at Merton College, Oxford. In 1962 he was elected a foreign honorary member of the American Academy of Arts and Sciences.

== Work ==
=== Physical chemistry ===
Polanyi's scientific interests were extremely diverse, including work in chemical kinetics, x-ray diffraction, and the adsorption of gases at solid surfaces. He is also well known for the potential theory of adsorption, which was disputed for quite some time. In 1921, he laid the mathematical foundation of fibre diffraction analysis. In 1934, Polanyi, at about the same time as G. I. Taylor and Egon Orowan, realised that the plastic deformation of ductile materials could be explained in terms of the theory of dislocations developed by Vito Volterra in 1905. The insight was critical in developing the field of solid mechanics.

=== Freedom and community ===
In 1936, as a consequence of an invitation to give lectures for the Ministry of Heavy Industry in the USSR, Polanyi met Bukharin, who told him that in socialist societies all scientific research is directed to accord with the needs of the latest Five Year Plan. Polanyi noted what had happened to the study of genetics in the Soviet Union once the doctrines of Trofim Lysenko had gained the backing of the State. Demands in Britain, for example by the Marxist John Desmond Bernal, for centrally planned scientific research led Polanyi to defend the claim that science requires free debate. Together with John Baker, he founded the influential Society for Freedom in Science.

In a series of articles, re-published in The Contempt of Freedom (1940) and The Logic of Liberty (1951), Polanyi claimed that co-operation amongst scientists is analogous to the way agents co-ordinate themselves within a free market. Just as consumers in a free market determine the value of products, science is a spontaneous order that arises as a consequence of open debate amongst specialists. Science (contrary to the claims of Bukharin) flourishes when scientists have the liberty to pursue truth as an end in itself:

[S]cientists, freely making their own choice of problems and pursuing them in the light of their own personal judgment, are in fact co-operating as members of a closely knit organization.

Such self-co-ordination of independent initiatives leads to a joint result which is unpremeditated by any of those who bring it about.

Any attempt to organize the group ... under a single authority would eliminate their independent initiatives, and thus reduce their joint effectiveness to that of the single person directing them from the centre. It would, in effect, paralyse their co-operation.

He derived the phrase spontaneous order from Gestalt psychology, and it was adopted by the classical liberal economist Friederich Hayek, although the concept can be traced back to at least Adam Smith. Polanyi unlike Hayek argued that there are higher and lower forms of spontaneous order, and he asserted that defending scientific inquiry on utilitarian or sceptical grounds undermined the practice of science. He extends this into a general claim about free societies. Polanyi defends a free society not on the negative grounds that we ought to respect "private liberties", but on the positive grounds that "public liberties" facilitate our pursuit of spiritual ends.

According to Polanyi, a free society that strives to be value-neutral undermines its own justification. But it is not enough for the members of a free society to believe that ideals such as truth, justice, and beauty, are not simply subjective, they also have to accept that they transcend our ability to wholly capture them. The non-subjectivity of values must be combined with acceptance that all knowing is fallible.

In Full Employment and Free Trade (1948) Polanyi analyses the way money circulates around an economy, and in a monetarist analysis that, according to Paul Craig Roberts, was thirty years ahead of its time, he argues that a free market economy should not be left to be wholly self-adjusting. A central bank should attempt to moderate economic booms/busts via a strict/loose monetary policy.

In 1940, he produced a film, "Unemployment and money. The principles involved", perhaps the first film about economics. The film defended a version of Keynesianism, neutral Keynesianism, that advised the State to use budget deficit and tax reductions to increase the amount of money in the circulation in times of economic hardship but did not seek direct investment or engage in public works.

=== All knowing is personal ===
In his book Science, Faith and Society (1946), Polanyi set out his opposition to a positivist account of science, noting that among other things it ignores the role personal commitments play in the practice of science. Polanyi gave the Gifford Lectures in 1951–52 at Aberdeen, and a revised version of his lectures were later published as Personal Knowledge (1958). In this book Polanyi claims that all knowledge claims (including those that derive from rules) rely on personal judgments. He denies that a scientific method can yield truth mechanically. All knowing, no matter how formalised, relies upon commitments. Polanyi argued that the assumptions that underlie critical philosophy are not only false, they undermine the commitments that motivate our highest achievements. He advocates a fiduciary post-critical approach, in which we recognise that we believe more than we can know, and know more than we can say.

A knower does not stand apart from the universe, but participates personally within it. Our intellectual skills are driven by passionate commitments that motivate discovery and validation. According to Polanyi, a great scientist not only identifies patterns, but also asks significant questions likely to lead to a successful resolution. Innovators risk their reputation by committing to a hypothesis. Polanyi cites the example of Copernicus, who declared that the Earth revolves around the Sun. He claims that Copernicus arrived at the Earth's true relation to the Sun not as a consequence of following a method, but via "the greater intellectual satisfaction he derived from the celestial panorama as seen from the Sun instead of the Earth." His writings on the practice of science influenced Thomas Kuhn and Paul Feyerabend.

Polanyi rejected the claim by British Empiricists that experience can be reduced into sense data, but he also rejects the notion that "indwelling" within (sometimes incompatible) interpretative frameworks traps us within them. Our tacit awareness connects us, albeit fallibly, with reality. It supplies us with the context within which our articulations have meaning. Contrary to the views of his colleague and friend Alan Turing, whose work at the Victoria University of Manchester prepared the way for the first modern computer, he denied that minds are reducible to collections of rules. His work influenced the critique by Hubert Dreyfus of "First Generation" artificial intelligence.

It was while writing Personal Knowledge that he identified the "structure of tacit knowing". He viewed it as his most important discovery. He claimed that we experience the world by integrating our subsidiary awareness into a focal awareness. In his later work, for example his Terry Lectures, later published as The Tacit Dimension (1966), he distinguishes between the phenomenological, instrumental, semantic, and ontological aspects of tacit knowing, as discussed (but not necessarily identified as such) in his previous writing.

=== Critique of reductionism ===
In "Life's irreducible structure" (1968), Polanyi argues that the information contained in the DNA molecule is not reducible to the laws of physics and chemistry. Although a DNA molecule cannot exist without physical properties, these properties are constrained by higher-level ordering principles. In "Transcendence and Self-transcendence" (1970), Polanyi criticises the mechanistic world view that modern science inherited from Galileo.

Polanyi advocates emergence i.e. the claim that there are several levels of reality and of causality. He relies on the assumption that boundary conditions supply degrees of freedom that, instead of being random, are determined by higher-level realities, whose properties are dependent on but distinct from the lower level from which they emerge. An example of a higher-level reality functioning as a downward causal force is consciousness – intentionality – generating meanings – intensionality.

Mind is a higher-level expression of the capacity of living organisms for discrimination. Our pursuit of self-set ideals such as truth and justice transform our understanding of the world. The reductionistic attempt to reduce higher-level realities into lower-level realities generates what Polanyi calls a moral inversion, in which the higher is rejected with moral passion. Polanyi identifies it as a pathology of the modern mind and traces its origins to a false conception of knowledge; although it is relatively harmless in the formal sciences, that pathology generates nihilism in the humanities. Polanyi considered Marxism an example of moral inversion. The State, on the grounds of an appeal to the logic of history, uses its coercive powers in ways that disregard any appeals to morality.

=== Tacit knowledge ===
Tacit knowledge, as distinct from explicit knowledge, is an influential term developed by Polanyi in The Tacit Dimension to describe among other things the ability to do something without necessarily being able to articulate it: for example, being able to ride a bicycle or play a musical instrument without being able to fully explain the details of how it happens. He claims that not only do practical skills rely upon tacit awareness, all perception and meaning is rendered possible by agents relying upon their tacit awareness. Every consciousness has a subsidiary and a focal awareness, and this distinction also has an ontological dimension, because a lower and a higher dimension is how emergence takes place.

== Bibliography ==
- 1932. Atomic Reactions. London: Williams and Norgate. 1932 – via Internet Archive.
- 1935. U.S.S.R. Economics
- 1940. The Contempt of Freedom. The Russian Experiment and After. London: Watts & Co. 1940. ISBN 978-0-405-06643-6 – via Internet Archive.
- 1944. Polanyi, Michael (Summer 1944). "Patent Reform". Review of Economic Studies. 11 (2): 61–76. doi:10.2307/2295967. JSTOR 2295967 – via Internet Archive.
- 1945. Full Employment and Free Trade. Cambridge: Cambridge University Press. 14 May 2024 – via Internet Archive.
- 1946. Science, Faith, and Society. Oxford Univ. Press. 1964. ISBN 0-226-67290-5.. Reprinted by the University of Chicago Press, 1964.
- 1951. The Logic of Liberty: reflections and rejoinders. Chicago and London: University of Chicago Press and Routledge. 1951. ISBN 0-226-67296-4 – via Internet Archive.
- 1958. Personal Knowledge: Towards a Post-Critical Philosophy (2nd ed.). University of Chicago Press. 1962. ISBN 0-226-67288-3 – via Internet Archive.
- 1959. The Study of Man: The Lindsay Memorial Lectures 1958. London and Chicago: Routledge and University of Chicago Press. 1959.
- 1960. Beyond Nihilism: The Thirteenth Arthur Stanley Eddington Memorial Lecture 16 February 1960. Cambridge: Cambridge University Press. 1960 – via Internet Archive.
- 1966. The Tacit Dimension. London and New York: Routledge and Doubleday and Company. 14 May 1967. ISBN 978-0-385-06988-5 – via Internet Archive. (University of Chicago Press. ISBN 978-0-226-67298-4. 2009 reprint)
- 1969. Greene, Marjorie, ed. (1969). Knowing and Being. Chicago and London: University of Chicago Press and (UK) Routledge and Kegan Paul.
- 1975 Polanyi, Michael; Prosch, Harry (1975). Meaning. Chicago: University of Chicago Press. ISBN 0-226-67294-8.
- 1997. Allen, R.T., ed. (1997). Society, Economics and Philosophy: Selected Papers of Michael Polanyi. New Brunswick NJ: Transaction Publishers. ISBN 978-1-56000-278-9 – via Internet Archive. Includes an annotated bibliography of Polanyi's publications.

== See also ==
- Credo ut intelligam
- Knowledge management
- List of Christians in science and technology
- Michael Polanyi Center
- George Holmes Howison's "Personal Idealism"

== Notes ==
Professional and academic associations
Preceded by Herbert John Fleure	President of the Manchester Literary and Philosophical Society; 1944–46	Succeeded by Thomas Bertram Lonsdale Webster
Preceded by Godfrey W. Armitage	President of the Manchester Statistical Society; 1950–51	Succeeded by Dr F. C. Toy
