= Melting-point depression =

Phenomenon in nanoscale materials

This article deals with melting/freezing point depression due to very small particle size. For depression due to the mixture of another compound, see freezing-point depression.

Melting-point depression is the phenomenon of reduction of the melting point of a material with a reduction of its size. This phenomenon is very prominent in nanoscale materials, which melt at temperatures hundreds of degrees lower than bulk materials.

== Introduction ==
The melting temperature of a bulk material is not dependent on its size. However, as the dimensions of a material decrease towards the atomic scale, the melting temperature scales with the material dimensions. The decrease in melting temperature can be on the order of tens to hundreds of degrees for metals with nanometer dimensions.

Melting-point depression is most evident in nanowires, nanotubes, and nanoparticles, which all melt at lower temperatures than bulk amounts of the same material. Changes in melting point occur because nanoscale materials have a much larger surface-to-volume ratio than bulk materials, drastically altering their thermodynamic and thermal properties.

Melting-point depression was mostly studied for nanoparticles, owing to their ease of fabrication and theoretical modeling. The melting temperature of a nanoparticle decreases sharply as the particle reaches critical diameter, usually < 50 nm for common engineering metals.

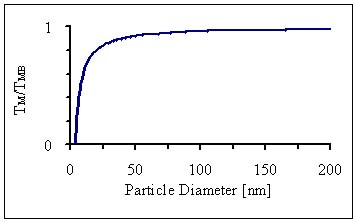
A normalized melting curve for gold as a function of nanoparticle diameter. The bulk melting temperature and melting temperature of the particle are denoted TMB and TM respectively. Experimental melting curves for near-spherical metal nanoparticles exhibit a similarly shaped curve.

Melting point depression is a very important issue for applications involving nanoparticles, as it decreases the functional range of the solid phase. Nanoparticles are currently used or proposed for prominent roles in catalyst, sensor, medicinal, optical, magnetic, thermal, electronic, and alternative energy applications. Nanoparticles must be in a solid state to function at elevated temperatures in several of these applications.

== Measurement techniques ==
Two techniques allow measurement of the melting point of the nanoparticle. The electron beam of a transmission electron microscope (TEM) can be used to melt nanoparticles. The melting temperature is estimated from the beam intensity, while changes in the diffraction conditions to indicate phase transition from solid to liquid. This method allows direct viewing of nanoparticles as they melt, making it possible to test and characterize samples with a wider distribution of particle sizes. The TEM limits the pressure range at which melting point depression can be tested.

More recently, researchers developed nanocalorimeters that directly measure the enthalpy and melting temperature of nanoparticles. Nanocalorimeters provide the same data as bulk calorimeters, however, additional calculations must account for the presence of the substrate supporting the particles. A narrow size distribution of nanoparticles is required since the procedure does not allow users to view the sample during the melting process. There is no way to characterize the exact size of melted particles during the experiment.

== History ==
Melting point depression was predicted in 1909 by Pawlow. It was directly observed inside an electron microscope in the 1960s–70s for nanoparticles of Pb, Au, and In.

== Physics ==
Nanoparticles have a much greater surface-to-volume ratio than bulk materials. The increased surface-to-volume ratio means surface atoms have a much greater effect on the chemical and physical properties of a nanoparticle. Surface atoms bind in the solid phase with less cohesive energy because they have fewer neighboring atoms in close proximity compared to atoms in the bulk of the solid. Each chemical bond an atom shares with a neighboring atom provides cohesive energy, so atoms with fewer bonds and neighboring atoms have lower cohesive energy. The cohesive energy of the nanoparticle has been theoretically calculated as a function of particle size according to Equation 1.

$E = E_B \left(1-\frac{d}{D} \right)$

Where: D = nanoparticle size

d = atomic size
E_{b} = cohesive energy of bulk

As Equation 1 shows, the effective cohesive energy of a nanoparticle approaches that of the bulk material as the material extends beyond the atomic size range (D>>d).

Atoms located at or near the surface of the nanoparticle have reduced cohesive energy due to a reduced number of cohesive bonds. An atom experiences an attractive force with all nearby atoms according to the Lennard-Jones potential.

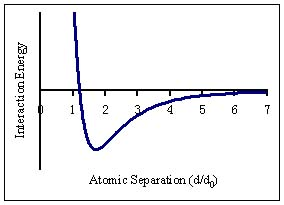
A Lennard-Jones potential energy curve. The model shows the interactive energy between 2 atoms at a normalized distance, d/d_{0}, where d_{0}=atomic diameter. The interaction energy is attractive where the curve is negative, and the magnitude of the energy represents the cohesive energy between a pair of atoms. Note that the attractive potential extends over a long range beyond the length of a chemical bond, so atoms experience cohesive energy with atoms further than their nearest neighbors.

The cohesive energy of an atom is directly related to the thermal energy required to free the atom from the solid. According to Lindemann's criterion, the melting temperature of a material is proportional to its cohesive energy, a_{v} (T_{M}=Ca_{v}). Since atoms near the surface have fewer bonds and reduced cohesive energy, they require less energy to free from the solid phase. Melting point depression of high surface-to-volume ratio materials results from this effect. For the same reason, surfaces of nanomaterials can melt at lower temperatures than the bulk material.

The theoretical size-dependent melting point of a material can be calculated through classical thermodynamic analysis. The result is the Gibbs–Thomson equation shown in Equation 2.

$T_M(d) = T_{MB} \left(1-\frac{4\sigma\,_{sl}}{H_f\rho\,_sd}\right)$

Where: T_{MB} = bulk melting temperature

σ_{sl} = solid–liquid interface energy
H_{f} = Bulk heat of fusion
ρ_{s} = density of solid
d = particle diameter

== Semiconductor/covalent nanoparticles ==
Equation 2 gives the general relation between the melting point of a metal nanoparticle and its diameter. However, recent work indicates the melting point of semiconductor and covalently bonded nanoparticles may have a different dependence on particle size. The covalent character of the bonds changes the melting physics of these materials. Researchers have demonstrated that Equation 3 more accurately models melting point depression in covalently bonded materials.

$T_M(d)=T_{MB}\left(1- \left(\frac{c}{d} \right)^2 \right)$
Where: T_{MB}=bulk melting temperature

c=materials constant
d=particle diameter

Equation 3 indicates that melting point depression is less pronounced in covalent nanoparticles due to the quadratic nature of particle size dependence in the melting Equation.

== Proposed mechanisms ==
The specific melting process for nanoparticles is currently unknown. The scientific community currently accepts several mechanisms as possible models of nanoparticle melting. Each of the corresponding models effectively matches experimental data for the melting of nanoparticles. Three of the four models detailed below derive the melting temperature in a similar form using different approaches based on classical thermodynamics. These models generally describe melting at a fixed nanoparticle size. Under high-vacuum conditions, nanoparticles can instead shrink by sublimation before reaching the size at which they melt.

=== Liquid drop model ===
The liquid drop model (LDM) assumes that an entire nanoparticle transitions from solid to liquid at a single temperature. This feature distinguishes the model, as the other models predict melting of the nanoparticle surface prior to the bulk atoms. If the LDM is true, a solid nanoparticle should function over a greater temperature range than other models predict. The LDM assumes that the surface atoms of a nanoparticle dominate the properties of all atoms in the particle. The cohesive energy of the particle is identical for all atoms in the nanoparticle.

The LDM represents the binding energy of nanoparticles as a function of the free energies of the volume and surface. Equation 4 gives the normalized, size-dependent melting temperature of a material according to the liquid-drop model.

$T_M(d)=\frac{4T_{MB}}{H_fd}\left(\sigma\,_{sv}-\sigma\,_{lv}\left(\frac{\rho\,_s}{\rho\,_l}\right)^{2/3}\right)$

Where: σ_{sv}=solid-vapor interface energy

σ_{lv}=liquid-vapor interface energy
H_{f}=Bulk heat of fusion
ρ_{s}=density of solid
ρ_{l}=density of liquid
d=diameter of nanoparticle

=== Liquid shell nucleation model ===
The liquid shell nucleation model (LSN) predicts that a surface layer of atoms melts prior to the bulk of the particle. The melting temperature of a nanoparticle is a function of its radius of curvature according to the LSN. Large nanoparticles melt at greater temperatures as a result of their larger radius of curvature.

The model calculates melting conditions as a function of two competing order parameters using Landau potentials. One order parameter represents a solid nanoparticle, while the other represents the liquid phase. Each of the order parameters is a function of particle radius.

The parabolic Landau potentials for the liquid and solid phases are calculated at a given temperature, with the lesser Landau potential assumed to be the equilibrium state at any point in the particle. In the temperature range of surface melting, the results show that the Landau curve of the ordered state is favored near the center of the particle while the Landau curve of the disordered state is smaller near the surface of the particle.

The Landau curves intersect at a specific radius from the center of the particle. The distinct intersection of the potentials means the LSN predicts a sharp, unmoving interface between the solid and liquid phases at a given temperature. The exact thickness of the liquid layer at a given temperature is the equilibrium point between the competing Landau potentials.

Equation 5 gives the condition at which an entire nanoparticle melts according to the LSN model.

$T_M(d)=\frac{4T_{MB}}{H_fd}\left(\frac{\sigma\,_{sv}}{1-\frac{d_0}{d}}-\sigma\,_{lv}\left(1-\frac{\rho\,_s}{\rho\,_l}\right)\right)$
Where: d_{0}=atomic diameter

=== Liquid nucleation and growth model ===
The liquid nucleation and growth model (LNG) treats nanoparticle melting as a surface-initiated process. The surface melts initially, and the liquid-solid interface quickly advances through the entire nanoparticle. The LNG defines melting conditions through the Gibbs-Duhem relations, yielding a melting temperature function dependent on the interfacial energies between the solid and liquid phases, the volumes and surface areas of each phase, and the size of the nanoparticle. The model calculations show that the liquid phase forms at lower temperatures for smaller nanoparticles. Once the liquid phase forms, the free energy conditions quickly change and favor melting. Equation 6 gives the melting conditions for a spherical nanoparticle according to the LNG model.

$T_M(d)=\frac{2T_{MB}}{H_fd} \left(\sigma\,_{sl}-\sigma\,_{lv}3 \left(\sigma\,_{sv}-\sigma\,_{lv}\frac{\rho\,_s}{\rho\,_l} \right) \right)$

=== Bond-order-length-strength (BOLS) model ===
The bond-order-length-strength (BOLS) model employs an atomistic approach to explain melting point depression. The model focuses on the cohesive energy of individual atoms rather than a classical thermodynamic approach. The BOLS model calculates the melting temperature for individual atoms from the sum of their cohesive bonds. As a result, the BOLS predicts the surface layers of a nanoparticle melt at lower temperatures than the bulk of the nanoparticle.

The BOLS mechanism states that if one bond breaks, the remaining neighbouring ones become shorter and stronger. The cohesive energy, or the sum of bond energy, of the less coordinated atoms determines the thermal stability, including melting, evaporating and other phase transition. The lowered CN changes the equilibrium bond length between atoms near the surface of the nanoparticle. The bonds relax towards equilibrium lengths, increasing the cohesive energy per bond between atoms, independent of the exact form of the specific interatomic potential. However, the integrated, cohesive energy for surface atoms is much lower than for bulk atoms due to the reduced coordination number and an overall decrease in cohesive energy.

Using a core–shell configuration, the melting point depression of nanoparticles is dominated by the outermost two atomic layers, yet atoms in the core interior retain their bulk nature.

The BOLS model and the core–shell structure have been applied to other size dependencies of nanostructures such as the mechanical strength, chemical and thermal stability, lattice dynamics (optical and acoustic phonons), Photon emission and absorption, electronic colevel shift and work function modulation, magnetism at various temperatures, and dielectrics due to electron polarization etc. Reproduction of experimental observations in the above-mentioned size dependency has been realized. Quantitative information, such as the energy level of an isolated atom and the vibration frequency of individual dimer, has been obtained by matching the BOLS predictions to the measured size dependency.

== Particle shape ==
Nanoparticle shape impacts the melting point of a nanoparticle. Facets, edges and deviations from a perfect sphere all change the magnitude of melting point depression. These shape changes affect the surface -to-volume ratio, which affects the cohesive energy and thermal properties of a nanostructure. Equation 7 gives a general shape-corrected formula for the theoretical melting point of a nanoparticle-based on its size and shape.

$T_M(d)=T_{MB} \left(1-\frac{c}{zd} \right)$
Where: c=materials constant

z=shape parameter of particle

The shape parameter is 1 for a sphere and 3/2 for a very long wire, indicating that melting-point depression is suppressed in nanowires compared to nanoparticles. Past experimental data show that nanoscale tin platelets melt within a narrow range of 10 °C of the bulk melting temperature. The melting point depression of these platelets was suppressed compared to spherical tin nanoparticles.

== Substrate ==
Several nanoparticle melting simulations theorize that the supporting substrate affects the extent of melting-point depression of a nanoparticle. These models account for energetic interactions between the substrate materials. A free nanoparticle, as many theoretical models assume, has a different melting temperature (usually lower) than a supported particle due to the absence of cohesive energy between the nanoparticle and substrate. However, measurement of the properties of a freestanding nanoparticle remains impossible, so the extent of the interactions cannot be verified through an experiment. Ultimately, substrates currently support nanoparticles for all nanoparticle applications, so substrate/nanoparticle interactions are always present and must impact melting point depression.

== Solubility ==
Within the size–pressure approximation, which considers the stress induced by the surface tension and the curvature of the particle, it was shown that the size of the particle affects the composition and temperature of a eutectic point (Fe-C), the solubility of C in Fe and Fe:Mo nanoclusters. Reduced solubility can affect the catalytic properties of nanoparticles. In fact it, has been shown that size-induced instability of Fe-C mixtures represents the thermodynamic limit for the thinnest nanotube that can be grown from Fe nanocatalysts.

== See also ==
- Freezing-point depression
- Tammann temperature and Hüttig temperature
- Thermoporometry and cryoporometry
