= Strange–Rahman–Smith equation =

The Strange–Rahman–Smith equation is used in the cryoporometry method of measuring porosity. NMR cryoporometry is a recent technique for measuring total porosity and pore size distributions. NMRC is based on two equations: the Gibbs–Thomson equation, which maps the melting point depression to pore size, and the Strange–Rahman–Smith equation, which maps the melted signal amplitude at a particular temperature to pore volume.

== Equation ==
If the pores of the porous material are filled with a liquid, then the incremental volume of the pores $\Delta v$ with pore diameter between $x$ and $x + \Delta\,x$ may be obtained from the increase in melted liquid volume for an increase of temperature between $T$ and $T + \Delta T$ by:

$\frac{dv}{dx} = \frac{dv}{d\,T} \frac{k_{GT}}{x^2}$

Where: $k_{GT}$ is the Gibbs–Thomson coefficient for the liquid in the pores.
