= Hilding =

Hilding may refer to:

Given name

- Hilding Ekelund (1893–1984), Finnish architect
- Hilding Ekman (1893–1966), Swedish runner
- Hilding Faxén (1892–1970), Swedish physicist
- Hilding Gavle (1901–1969), Swedish actor
- Hilding Hagberg (1899–1993), Swedish communist politician
- Hilding Hallnäs (1903–1984), Swedish composer
- Hilding Kring (1899–1971), Swedish Army lieutenant general
- Hilding Köhler (1888–1982), Swedish meteorologist
- Hilding Rosenberg (1892–1985), Swedish modernist composer
- Hilding Alfred Swanson (1885-1964), American lawyer and politician

Surname

- Knud Hilding (1921–1975), Danish actor
