= Sten Lagergren =

Swedish physical chemist

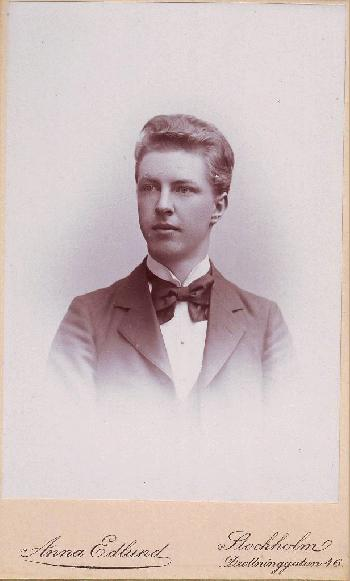
- Lagergren in 1896
- Born: Sten Yngve Dennis Lagergren; 6 May 1876; Ramnäs
- Died: 4 April 1922 (aged 45); Lidingö
- Education: Stockholms Högskola
- Occupation: Secondary school teacher
- Known for: Fundamental results in adsorption kinetics
- Spouse: Alfhild Lindström (m. 1906–1922)
- Parents: Per Henrik Lagergren (father); Hilda Amalia Vistrand (mother)

Sten Yngve Dennis Lagergren (6 May 1876 – 4 April 1922) was a Swedish physical chemist known for his fundamental findings in adsorption kinetics.

Lagergrens's 1898 article "Zur Theorie der Sogenannten Adsorption Gelöster Stoffe" (To the theory of the so-called adsorption of dissolved materials) brought him a lasting fame. In 2018, 120 years after its publication, the paper was cited more than 800 times according to Clarivate Analytics' Web of Science, making its total number of citation above 6000. In addition, his name became an eponym in the form of Lagergren equation or Lagergren kinetics occurring several thousand times in the literature.

== Biography ==
=== Early life ===
Sten Lagergren was born in Ramnäs, Sweden on 6 May 1876. His father, Per Henrik Lagergren, was a commercial agent, his mother was Hilda Amalia Vistrand.

=== Education and professional career ===
Lagergren attended to the university college Stockholms högskola (Stockholm Highschool; the predecessor of the present Stockholm University), and studied there between 1894 and 1899.

He wrote the paper that made him famous as a university student. Apparently, it made him a "one hit wonder", since no other notable scientific paper have been written by him anymore.

He became a secondary school teacher, and was the rector of the Sofi Almquists samskola from 1902 and of the Beskowska skolan between 1905 and 1913. He was the author of several secondary school textbooks in geometry.

=== Marriage and children ===
Lagergren married Alfhild Lindström (born in 1877) in 1906. They had one daughter.

=== Death ===
Sten Lagergren died on 4 April 1922 in Lidingö, Sweden.

== His classic work and its aftermath ==
In his perennial 1898 paper, Lagergren formulated a so-called pseudo-first-order model for adsorption kinetics based on an extensive body of experimental measurements. Both the empirical data and the model were highly acclaimed by the contemporaries. In 1900, Wilhelm Ostwald (Nobel Prize winner in Chemistry in 1909) wrote an unusually extensive review of the paper in his Zeitschrift für physikalische Chemie. Beyond words of recognition, Ostwald also drafted some ideas to further develop the model. Actually, having abandoned research, Lagergren could not give thought to these advises. The path was followed, instead, by Herbert Freundlich. His paper based on his habilitation lecture heavily relies upon Lagergren's results. They were also included in his classic book, in its later editions, and since then, in all standard treatises of surface chemistry and related areas.

The first occurrence of the eponymic use of Lagergren's name can be traced back to an article of Dietl ("Lagergren'sche Formel" on p. 800).

The use of Lagergren's model gained a new impetus in the beginning of the 21st century largely with the advent of sorption-based technologies of water desalination. A citation review of Lagergren's equation counted about 170 papers citing Lagergren's original paper until 2004. Within 10 years, this number exhibited a twentyfold increase.
