= Freundlich equation =

Empirical adsorption isotherm

The Freundlich equation or Freundlich adsorption isotherm, an adsorption isotherm, is an empirical relationship between the quantity of a gas adsorbed into a solid surface and the gas pressure. The same relationship is also applicable for the concentration of a solute adsorbed onto the surface of a solid and the concentration of the solute in the liquid phase. In 1909, Herbert Freundlich gave an expression representing the isothermal variation of adsorption of a quantity of gas adsorbed by unit mass of solid adsorbent with gas pressure. This equation is known as Freundlich adsorption isotherm or Freundlich adsorption equation. As this relationship is entirely empirical, in the case where adsorption behavior can be properly fit by isotherms with a theoretical basis, it is usually appropriate to use such isotherms instead (see for example the Langmuir and BET adsorption theories). The Freundlich equation is also derived (non-empirically) by attributing the change in the equilibrium constant of the binding process to the heterogeneity of the surface and the variation in the heat of adsorption.

== Freundlich adsorption isotherm ==

The Freundlich adsorption isotherm is mathematically expressed as

$\frac{x}{m} = K \cdot c_{\,\mathrm{eq}}^{\,1/n}$	1

In Freundlich's notation (used for his experiments dealing with the adsorption of organic acids on coal in aqueous solutions), $x/m$ signifies the ratio between the adsorbed mass or adsorbate $x$ and the mass of the adsorbent $m$, which in Freundlich's studies was coal. In the figure above, the x-axis represents $c_{\mathrm{\,eq}}$, which denotes the equilibrium concentration of the adsorbate within the solvent.

Freundlich's numerical analysis of the three organic acids for the parameters $K$ and $n$ according to equation 1 were:

acid type	K	n
acetic	2.606	2.35
propionic	3.463	2.82
succinic	4.426	3.65

Freundlich's experimental data can also be used in a contemporary computer based fit. These values are added to appreciate the numerical work done in 1907.

Computer based fit (according to eq. 1 ) with Freundlich's experimental data
acid type	K	△ K	n	△ n
acetic	2.56	0.035	2.565	0.075
propionic	3.292	0.0471	3.005	0.104
succinic	4.28	0.11	3.884	0.21

△ K and △ n values are the error bars of the computer based fit. The K and n values itself are used to calculate the dotted lines in the figure.

Equation 1 can also be written as

$$\log \frac{x}{m}  = \log K + \frac{1}{n}  \log c_{eq}$$

Sometimes also this notation for experiments in the gas phase can be found:

$$\log \frac{x}{m}  = \log K + \frac{1}{n}  \log p$$

x = mass of adsorbate
m = mass of adsorbent
p = equilibrium pressure of the gaseous adsorbate in case of experiments made in the gas phase (gas/solid interaction with gaseous species/adsorbed species)

K and n are constants for a given adsorbate and adsorbent at a given temperature (from there, the term isotherm needed to avoid significant gas pressure fluctuations due to uncontrolled temperature variations in the case of adsorption experiments of a gas onto a solid phase).

K = distribution coefficient
n = correction factor

At high pressure 1/n = 0, hence extent of adsorption becomes independent of pressure.

The Freundlich equation is unique; consequently, if the data fit the equation, it is only likely, but not proved, that the surface is heterogeneous. The heterogeneity of the surface can be confirmed with calorimetry. Homogeneous surfaces (or heterogeneous surfaces that exhibit homogeneous adsorption (single site)) have a constant ΔH of adsorption. On the other hand, heterogeneous adsorption (multi-site) have a variable ΔH of adsorption depending on the percent of sites occupied. When the adsorbate pressure in the gas phase (or the concentration in solution) is low, high-energy sites will be occupied first. As the pressure in the gas phase (or the concentration in solution) increases, the low-energy sites will then be occupied resulting in a weaker ΔH of adsorption.

== Limitation of Freundlich adsorption isotherm ==
Experimentally it was determined that extent of gas adsorption varies directly with pressure, and then it directly varies with pressure raised to the power 1/n until saturation pressure P_{s} is reached. Beyond that point, the rate of adsorption saturates even after applying higher pressure. Thus, the Freundlich adsorption isotherm fails at higher pressure.

== See also ==
- Langmuir adsorption model
