= Tammann temperature and Hüttig temperature =

Chemical properties of materials

The Tammann temperature (also spelled Tamman temperature) and the Hüttig temperature of a given solid material are approximations to the absolute temperatures at which atoms in a bulk crystal lattice (Tammann) or on the surface (Hüttig) of the solid material become sufficiently mobile to diffuse readily, and are consequently more chemically reactive and susceptible to recrystallization, agglomeration, or sintering.

The Tammann temperature is usually taken to be 0.5 times the absolute temperature of the compound's melting point.

The Hüttig temperature is usually taken to be 0.3 or 0.333 times the absolute temperature of the compound's melting point.

(The absolute temperatures are usually measured in kelvin.)

The Tammann and Hüttig temperatures are important for considerations in catalytic activity, segregation, and sintering of solid materials. The Tammann temperature is important for reactive compounds like explosives and fuel oxiders, such as potassium chlorate (KClO_{3}, T_{Tammann} = 42 °C), potassium nitrate (KNO_{3}, T_{Tammann} = 31 °C), and sodium nitrate (NaNO_{3}, T_{Tammann} = 17 °C), which may unexpectedly react at much lower temperatures than their melting or decomposition temperatures.

The bulk compounds should be contrasted with nanoparticles which exhibit melting-point depression, meaning that they have significantly lower melting points than the bulk material, and correspondingly lower Tammann and Hüttig temperatures. For instance, 2 nm gold nanoparticles melt at only about 327 °C, in contrast to 1065 °C for bulk gold.

== History ==
The Tammann temperature was pioneered by German astronomer, solid-state chemistry, and physics professor Gustav Tammann in 1919. He had considered a lattice motion very important for the reactivity of matter and quantified his theory by calculating a ratio of the given material temperatures at solid–liquid phases at absolute temperatures. The division of a solid's temperature by a melting point would yield a Tammann temperature. The value is usually measured in Kelvins (K):

$T_{\text{Tammann}} ={\beta} {\times} T_{\text{melting point}} (\text{in K})$

where ${\beta}$ is a constant dimensionless number.

The threshold temperature for activation and diffusion of atoms at surfaces was studied by de:Gustav Franz Hüttig, physical chemist on the faculty of Graz University of Technology, who wrote in 1948 (translated from German):

In the solid state, the atoms oscillate about their position in the lattice. ... There are always some atoms which happen to be highly energized. Such an atom may become dislodged and switch places with another one (exchange reaction) or it may, for a time, travel about aimlessly. ... the number of diffusing atoms increases with rising temperature, first slowly, and in the higher temperature ranges more rapidly. For every metal there is a definite temperature at which the exchange process is suddenly accelerated. The relationship between this temperature and the melting point in degrees K is constant for all metals. ... On the basis of these elementary processes, sintering is analyzed in relation to the coefficient α which is the fraction of the melting point in degrees K ... When α is between 0.23 and 0.36, activation as a result of the surface diffusion takes place. Loosening or release of adsorbed gases occurs simultaneously.

== Description ==
The Hüttig temperature for a given material is

$$T_{\mathrm{\text{Hüttig}}} = \alpha \times T_{\mathrm{mp}}$$

where $T_{\text{mp}}$ is the absolute temperature of the material's bulk melting point (usually specified in kelvin units) and $\alpha$ is a unitless constant that is independent of the material, having the value $\alpha=0.3$ according to some sources, or $\alpha=1/3$ according to other sources. It is an approximation to the temperature necessary for a metal or metal oxide surfaces to show significant atomic diffusion along the surface, sintering, and surface recrystallization. Desorption of adsorbed gases and chemical reactivity of the surface often increase markedly as the temperature is increases above the Hüttig temperature.

The Tammann temperature for a given material is

$$T_{\mathrm{Tammann}}=\beta \times T_{\mathrm{mp}}$$

where $\beta$ is a unitless constant usually taken to be $0.5$, regardless of the material. It is an approximation to the temperature necessary for mobility and diffusion of atoms, ions, and defects within a bulk crystal. Bulk chemical reactivity often increase markedly as the temperature is increased above the Tammann temperature.

== Examples ==
The following table gives an example Tammann and Hüttig temperatures calculated from each compound's melting point T_{mp} according to:

T_{Tammann} = 0.5 × T_{mp}
T_{Hüttig} = 0.3 × T_{mp}

Temperatures for metal and semimetal oxides.
Compound	Ion type	T_{Tammann} (K)	T_{Tammann} (°C)	T_{Hüttig} (K)	T_{Hüttig} (°C)
Ag	-	617	344	370	97
Au	-	668	395	401	128
Co	-	877	604	526	253
Cu	-	678	405	407	134
CuO	O^{2−}	800	527	480	207
Cu_{2}O	O^{2−}	754	481	452	179
CuCl_{2}	Cl^{1−}	447	174	268	−5
Cu_{2}Cl_{2}	Cl^{1−}	352	79	211	−62
Fe	-	904	631	542	269
Mo	-	1442	1169	865	592
MoO_{3}	O^{2−}	904	631	320	47
MoS_{2}	S^{2−}	729	456	437	164
Ni	-	863	590	518	245
NiO	O^{2−}	1114	841	668	395
NiCl_{2}	Cl^{2−}	641	368	384	111
Ni(CO)_{4}	O^{2−}	127	−146	76	−197
Rh	-	1129	856	677	404
Ru	-	1362	1089	817	544
Pd	-	914	641	548	275
PdO	O^{2−}	512	239	307	34
Pt	-	1014	741	608	335
PtO	O^{2−}	412	139	247	−26
PtO_{2}	O^{2−}	362	89	217	−56
PtCl_{2}	Cl^{2−}	427	154	256	−17
PtCl_{4}	Cl^{2−}	322	49	193	−80
Zn	-	347	74	208	−65
ZnO	O^{2−}	1124	851	674	401
Si	-	877	604	438	165
SiO_{2}	O^{2−}	1032	759	516	243
FeO	O^{2−}	858	585	426	156
Fe_{3}O_{4}	O^{2−}	972	699	486	213

== See also ==
- Chemical kinetics – Study of the rates of chemical reactions
- Chemical thermodynamics – Study of chemical reactions within the laws of thermodynamics
- Glass transition – Reversible transition in amorphous materials
- Surface melting – Formation of a quasi-liquid film on the surface of a solid
