= Herbert Freundlich =

German chemist (1880–1941)

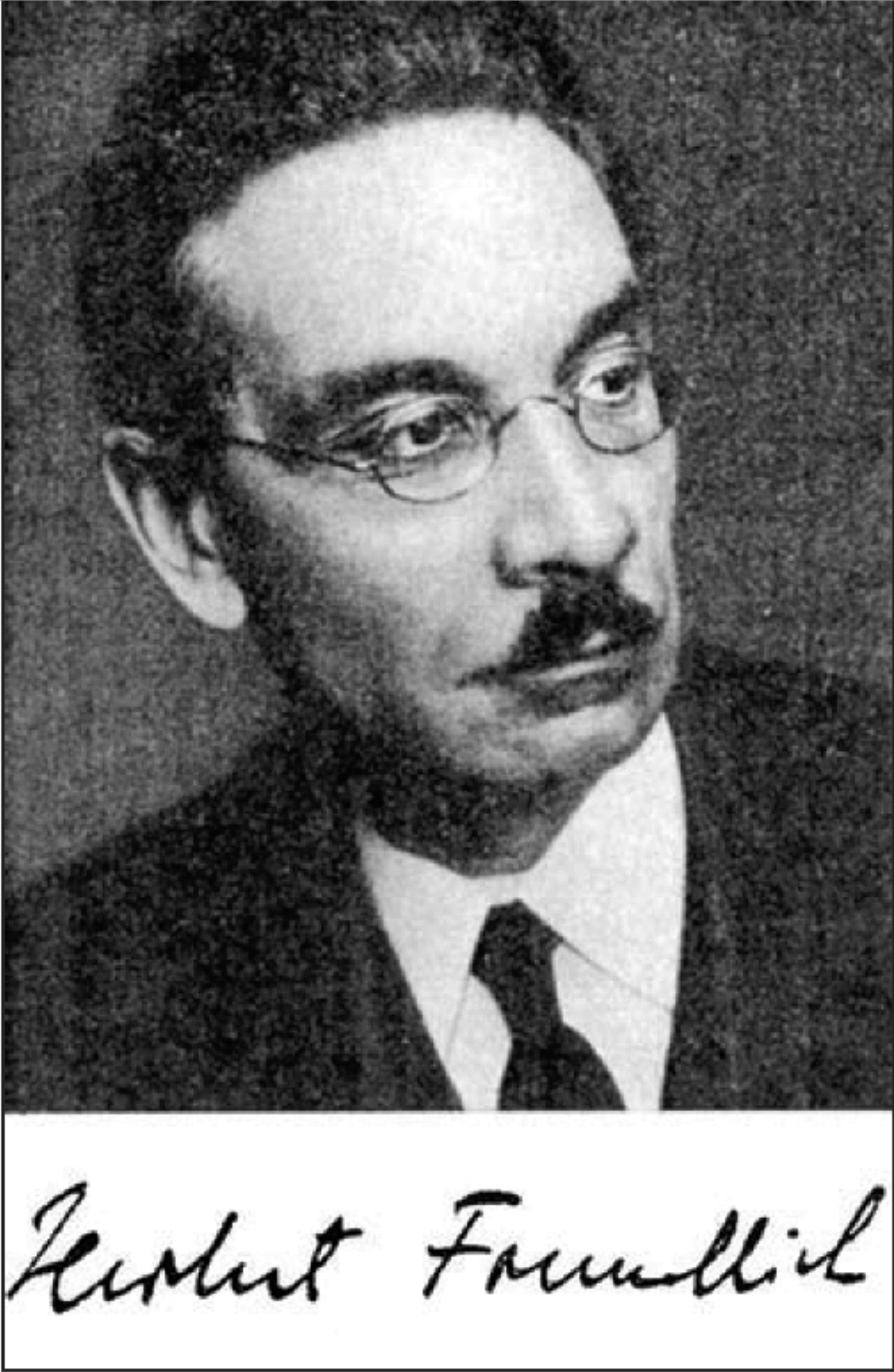
- Herbert Freundlich
- Born: January 28, 1880; Charlottenburg
- Died: March 30, 1941 (aged 61); Minneapolis
- Known for: Freundlich equation Ostwald–Freundlich equation
- Awards: FRS (1939); Liversidge Award (1929)
- Scientific career
- Fields: Chemistry
- Institutions: Kaiser Wilhelm Institute for Physical Chemistry and Electrochemistry; University of Minnesota
- Doctoral students: Morton Masius
- Other notable students: Robert Havemann

Herbert Max Finlay Freundlich ForMemRS (28 January 1880 in Charlottenburg – 30 March 1941 in Minneapolis) was a German chemist.

== Biography ==
His father was of German Jewish descent, and his mother (née Finlay) was from Scotland. His younger brother was Erwin Finlay Freundlich (1885–1964).

He was a department head at the Kaiser Wilhelm Institute for Physical Chemistry and Electrochemistry (now the Fritz Haber Institute) from 1919 until 1933, when the racial policies of the Nazi party demanded the dismissal of non-Aryans from senior posts. In 1934 he became a foreign member of the Royal Netherlands Academy of Arts and Sciences.

Emigrating to England, Freundlich accepted a guest professorship at University College London. Five years later, he accepted a professorship at the University of Minnesota. He died in Minneapolis two years later.

Freundlich's main works dealt with the coagulation and stability of colloidal solutions.

His most prominent student was Robert Havemann who became a well known colloid chemist of the German Democratic Republic.

His work is of continuing importance, with his 1907 paper "Über die Adsorption in Lösungen" (On adsorption in solutions) becoming highly cited at the beginning of the 21st century. This early paper was based on his habilitation thesis written in Leipzig under the guidance of Wilhelm Ostwald, and was heavily based on the work of Sten Lagergren.

== See also ==
- Freundlich equation
- Ostwald–Freundlich equation
- Thixotropy
