= Gibbs–Thomson equation =

Phenomenon in physics

The Gibbs–Thomson effect, in common physics usage, refers to variations in vapor pressure or chemical potential across a curved surface or interface. The existence of a positive interfacial energy will increase the energy required to form small particles with high curvature, and these particles will exhibit an increased vapor pressure. See Ostwald–Freundlich equation. More specifically, the Gibbs–Thomson effect refers to the observation that small crystals that are in equilibrium with their liquid, melt at a lower temperature than large crystals. In cases of confined geometry, such as liquids contained within porous media, this leads to a depression in the freezing point / melting point that is inversely proportional to the pore size, as given by the Gibbs–Thomson equation.

== Introduction ==
The technique is closely related to using gas adsorption to measure pore sizes, but uses the Gibbs–Thomson equation rather than the Kelvin equation. They are both particular cases of the Gibbs Equations of Josiah Willard Gibbs: the Kelvin equation is the constant temperature case, and the Gibbs–Thomson equation is the constant pressure case. This behaviour is closely related to the capillary effect and both are due to the change in bulk free energy caused by the curvature of an interfacial surface under tension. The original equation only applies to isolated particles, but with the addition of surface interaction terms (usually expressed in terms of the contact wetting angle) can be modified to apply to liquids and their crystals in porous media. As such it has given rise to various related techniques for measuring pore size distributions. (See Thermoporometry and cryoporometry.) The Gibbs–Thomson effect lowers both melting and freezing point, and also raises boiling point. However, simple cooling of an all-liquid sample usually leads to a state of non-equilibrium super cooling and only eventual non-equilibrium freezing. To obtain a measurement of the equilibrium freezing event, it is necessary to first cool enough to freeze a sample with excess liquid outside the pores, then warm the sample until the liquid in the pores is all melted, but the bulk material is still frozen. Then, on re-cooling the equilibrium freezing event can be measured, as the external ice will then grow into the pores. This is in effect an "ice intrusion" measurement (cf. mercury intrusion), and as such in part may provide information on pore throat properties. The melting event can be expected to provide more accurate information on the pore body.

== For particles ==
For an isolated spherical solid particle of diameter $d$ in its own liquid, the Gibbs–Thomson equation for the structural melting point depression can be written:

$$\Delta\,T_m=T_{mB}-T_m(d)=T_{mB}\frac{4\sigma_{sl}}{H_f\rho_sd}$$

where:

- T_{mB} = bulk melting temperature
- σ_{sl} = solid–liquid interface energy (per unit area)
- H_{f} = bulk enthalpy of fusion (per gram of material)
- ρ_{s} = density of solid
- d = nanoparticle size

== For liquids in pores ==
Very similar equations may be applied to the growth and melting of crystals in the confined geometry of porous systems. However the geometry term for the crystal-liquid interface may be different, and there may be additional surface energy terms to consider, which can be written as a wetting angle term $\cos\phi\,$. The angle is usually considered to be near 180°. In cylindrical pores there is some evidence that the freezing interface may be spherical, while the melting interface may be cylindrical, based on preliminary measurements for the measured ratio for $\Delta\,T_f / \Delta\,T_m$ in cylindrical pores.

Thus for a spherical interface between a non-wetting crystal and its own liquid, in an infinite cylindrical pore of diameter $x$, the structural melting point depression is given by:

$$\Delta\,T_m(x) = T_{mB}-T_m(x)= - T_{mB}\frac{4\sigma\,_{sl}\cos\phi\,}{H_f\rho\,_sx}$$

== Simplified equation ==
The Gibbs–Thomson equation may be written in a compact form:

$$\Delta\,T_m(x)= \frac{k_{GT}}{x}$$

where the Gibbs–Thomson coefficient $k_{GT}$ assumes different values for different liquids and different interfacial geometries (spherical/cylindrical/planar).

In more detail:,

$$\Delta\,T_m(x)= \frac{k_{GT}}{x} = \frac{k_g \, k_s \, k_i}{x}$$

where:

- $k_g$ is a geometric constant dependent on the interfacial shape,
- $k_s$ is a constant involving parameters specific to the crystalline solid of solid–liquid system, and
- $k_i$ is an interfacial energy term.

== History ==
As early as 1886, Robert von Helmholtz (son of the German physicist Hermann von Helmholtz) had observed that finely dispersed liquids have a higher vapor pressure. By 1906, the German physical chemist Friedrich Wilhelm Küster (1861–1917) had predicted that since the vapor pressure of a finely pulverized volatile solid is greater than the vapor pressure of the bulk solid, then the melting point of the fine powder should be lower than that of the bulk solid. Investigators such as the Russian physical chemists Pavel Nikolaevich Pavlov (or Pawlow (in German), 1872–1953) and Peter Petrovich von Weymarn (1879–1935), among others, searched for and eventually observed such melting point depression. By 1932, Czech investigator Paul Kubelka (1900–1956) had observed that the melting point of iodine in activated charcoal is depressed as much as 100 °C. Investigators recognized that the melting point depression occurred when the change in surface energy was significant compared to the latent heat of the phase transition, which condition obtained in the case of very small particles.

Neither Josiah Willard Gibbs nor William Thomson (Lord Kelvin) derived the Gibbs–Thomson equation. Also, although many sources claim that British physicist J. J. Thomson derived the Gibbs–Thomson equation in 1888, he did not. Early in the 20th century, investigators derived precursors of the Gibbs–Thomson equation. However, in 1920, the Gibbs–Thomson equation was first derived in its modern form by two researchers working independently: Friedrich Meissner, a student of the Estonian-German physical chemist Gustav Tammann, and Ernst Rie (1896–1921), an Austrian physicist at the University of Vienna. These early investigators did not call the relation the "Gibbs–Thomson" equation. That name was in use by 1910 or earlier; it originally referred to equations concerning the adsorption of solutes by interfaces between two phases — equations that Gibbs and then J. J. Thomson derived. Hence, in the name "Gibbs–Thomson" equation, "Thomson" refers to J. J. Thomson, not William Thomson (Lord Kelvin).

In 1871, William Thomson published an equation describing capillary action and relating the curvature of a liquid-vapor interface to the vapor pressure:

$$p(r_1 , r_2) = P - \frac { \gamma\,  \rho_\text{vapor} } {(\rho_\text{liquid} - \rho_\text{vapor})}\left ( \frac {1}{r_1} + \frac {1}{r_2}\right )$$

where:

- $p(r)$ = vapor pressure at a curved interface of radius $r$
- $P$ = vapor pressure at a flat interface ($r = \infty$) = $p_{eq}$
- $\gamma$ = surface tension
- $\rho_\text{vapor}$ = density of vapor
- $\rho_\text{liquid}$ = density of liquid
- $r_1$, $r_2$ = radii of curvature along the principal sections of the curved interface.

In his dissertation of 1885, Robert von Helmholtz (son of German physicist Hermann von Helmholtz) showed how the Ostwald–Freundlich equation

$$\ln \left ( \frac {p(r)} {P} \right ) = \frac {2 \gamma V_\text{molecule} } {k_B T r}$$

could be derived from Kelvin's equation. The Gibbs–Thomson equation can then be derived from the Ostwald–Freundlich equation via a simple substitution using the integrated form of the Clausius–Clapeyron relation:

$$\ln \left ( \frac {P_2}{P_1} \right ) = \frac {L}{R} \left ( \frac {1}{T_1} - \frac {1}{T_2} \right ).$$

The Gibbs–Thomson equation can also be derived directly from Gibbs' equation for the energy of an interface between phases.

It should be mentioned that in the literature, there is still not agreement about the specific equation to which the name "Gibbs–Thomson equation" refers. For example, in the case of some authors, it's another name for the "Ostwald–Freundlich equation"—which, in turn, is often called the "Kelvin equation"—whereas in the case of other authors, the "Gibbs–Thomson relation" is the Gibbs free energy that's required to expand the interface, and so forth.
