= Peter P. von Weymarn =

Russian chemist (1879–1935)

Peter Petrovich von Weymarn
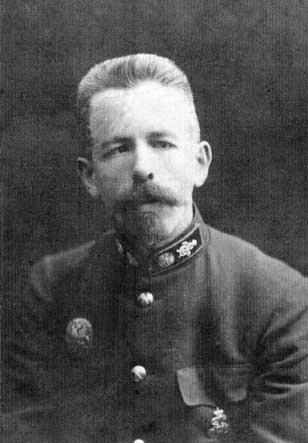
- Peter Petrovich von Weymarn in 1914
- Born: July 17, 1879; St. Petersburg, Russia
- Died: June 2, 1935 (aged 55)
- Known for: von Weymarn law
- Scientific career
- Fields: Colloid science

Peter Petrovich von Weymarn (commonly mis-spelt von Weimarn) (July 17, 1879 – June 2, 1935) was a chemist known for his groundwork in colloid science.

== Biography ==
He was born in St. Petersburg in 1879. He served as president of the Urals Metallurgical Institute in Ekaterinburg and was also associated with the Vladivostok Polytechnic University (1920–1922). In 1922 he moved to Japan, where he researched at the Imperial Industrial Research Institute in Osaka. He then moved to Shanghai, where he worked at the Technical Center. He died in Shanghai on June 2, 1935.

In 1906 he stated the von Weymarn law: Colloidal dispersions are obtained from very dilute or very concentrated solutions but not from intermediate solutions. The relative supersaturation ratio herein is defined by S=(Q-L)/L (where Q is the amount of the dissolved material and L is its solubility).

== Bibliography ==
- von Weimarn, P P: "Der kolloide Zustand als allgemeine Eigenschaft der Materie (I-III)", Russ. Phys. Chem. Gesellschaft, 1906
- von Weimarn, P P: "Grundzüge der Dispersoidchemie", Dresden 1911 Digital edition by the University and State Library Düsseldorf
- von Weimarn, P P: "Die Allgemeinheit des Kolloidzustandes", Dresden 1925
