= Ostwald–Freundlich equation =

Equation describing a phase boundary

The Ostwald–Freundlich equation governs boundaries between two phases; specifically, it relates the surface tension of the boundary to its curvature, the ambient temperature, and the vapor pressure or chemical potential in the two phases.

The Ostwald–Freundlich equation for a droplet or particle with radius $R$ is:

$$\frac{p}{p_{\rm eq}} = \exp{\left(\frac{R_{\rm critical}}{R}\right)}$$
$$R_{critical} = \frac{2 \cdot \gamma \cdot V_{\rm atom}}{k_{\rm B} \cdot T}$$

$V_{\rm atom}$ = atomic volume
$k_{\rm B}$ = Boltzmann constant
$\gamma$ = surface tension (J $\cdot$ m^{−2})
$p_{\rm eq}$ = equilibrium partial pressure (or chemical potential or concentration)
$p$ = partial pressure (or chemical potential or concentration)
$T$ = absolute temperature

One consequence of this relation is that small liquid droplets (i.e., particles with a high surface curvature) exhibit a higher effective vapor pressure, since the surface is larger in comparison to the volume.

Another notable example of this relation is Ostwald ripening, in which surface tension causes small precipitates to dissolve and larger ones to grow. Ostwald ripening is thought to occur in the formation of orthoclase megacrysts in granites as a consequence of subsolidus growth. See rock microstructure for more.

== History ==
In 1871, Lord Kelvin (William Thomson) obtained the following relation governing a liquid-vapor interface:

$$p(r_1 , r_2) = P - \frac {\gamma\,  \rho\, _{\rm vapor} } {(\rho\,_{\rm liquid} - \rho\,_{\rm vapor})}\left ( \frac {1}{r_1} + \frac {1}{r_2}\right ),$$

where:

$p(r)$ = vapor pressure at a curved interface of radius $r$
$P$ = vapor pressure at flat interface ($r = \infty$) = $p_{eq}$
$\gamma$ = surface tension
$\rho\, _{\rm vapor}$ = density of vapor
$\rho\, _{\rm liquid}$ = density of liquid
$r_1$ , $r_2$ = radii of curvature along the principal sections of the curved interface.

In his dissertation of 1885, Robert von Helmholtz (son of the German physicist Hermann von Helmholtz) derived the Ostwald–Freundlich equation and showed that Kelvin's equation could be transformed into the Ostwald–Freundlich equation. The German physical chemist Wilhelm Ostwald derived the equation apparently independently in 1900; however, his derivation contained a minor error which the German chemist Herbert Freundlich corrected in 1909.

== Derivation from Kelvin's equation ==
According to Lord Kelvin's equation of 1871,

$$p(r_1 , r_2) = P - \frac {\gamma\,  \rho\, _{\rm vapor} } {(\rho\,_{\rm liquid} - \rho\,_{\rm vapor})}\left ( \frac {1}{r_1} + \frac {1}{r_2}\right ).$$

If the particle is assumed to be spherical, then $r = r_1 = r_2$; hence,

$$p(r) = P - \frac {2  \gamma\,  \rho\, _{\rm vapor} } {(\rho\,_{\rm liquid} - \rho\,_{\rm vapor}) r}.$$

Note: Kelvin defined the surface tension $\gamma$ as the work that was performed per unit area by the interface rather than on the interface; hence his term containing $\gamma$ has a minus sign. In what follows, the surface tension will be defined so that the term containing $\gamma$ has a plus sign.

Since $\rho\, _{\rm liquid} \gg \rho\, _{\rm vapor}$, then $\rho\, _{\rm liquid} - \rho\, _{\rm vapor} \approx \rho\, _{\rm liquid}$; hence,

$$p(r) \approx P + \frac {2  \gamma\,  \rho\, _{\rm vapor} } {\rho\,_{\rm liquid} \cdot r}.$$

Assuming that the vapor obeys the ideal gas law, then

$$\rho\, _{\rm vapor} = \frac {m_{\rm vapor}} {V} = \frac {MW \cdot n} {V} = \frac {MW \cdot P} {RT} = \frac {MW \cdot P} {N_{\rm A} k_{\rm B} T},$$

where:

$m_{\rm vapor}$ = mass of a volume $V$ of vapor
$MW$ = molecular weight of vapor
$n$ = number of moles of vapor in volume $V$ of vapor
$N_{\rm A}$ = Avogadro constant
$R$ = ideal gas constant = $N_{\rm A} k_{\rm B}$

Since $\frac {MW} {N_{\rm A}}$ is the mass of one molecule of vapor or liquid, then

$\frac {\left ( \frac {MW} {N_{\rm A}} \right )} {\rho\, _{\rm liquid}} =$ volume of one molecule $= V_{\rm molecule}$ .

Hence

$p(r) \approx P + \frac {2 \gamma V_{\rm molecule} P} {k_{\rm B} T r} = P + \frac {R_{\rm critical} P} {r},$ where $R_{\rm critical} = \frac {2 \gamma V_{\rm molecule}} {k_{\rm B} T}$ .

Thus

$$\frac {p(r) - P} {P} \approx \frac {R_{\rm critical}} {r}.$$

Since

$$\frac {p(r)} {P} = 1 - \frac {P - p(r)} {P},$$

then

$$\log \left ( \frac {p(r)} {P} \right ) = \log \left (1 - \frac {P - p(r)} {P} \right ).$$

Since $p(r) \approx P$, then $\frac {P - p(r)} {P} \ll 1$ . If $x \ll 1$, then $\log \left (1 - x \right ) \approx -x$. Hence

$$\log \left ( \frac {p(r)} {P} \right ) \approx \frac {p(r) - P} {P}.$$

Therefore

$$\log \left ( \frac {p(r)} {P} \right ) \approx \frac {R_{\rm critical}} {r},$$

which is the Ostwald–Freundlich equation.

== See also ==
- Köhler theory
- Kelvin equation
