= Hilding Köhler =

Swedish meteorologist (1888–1982)

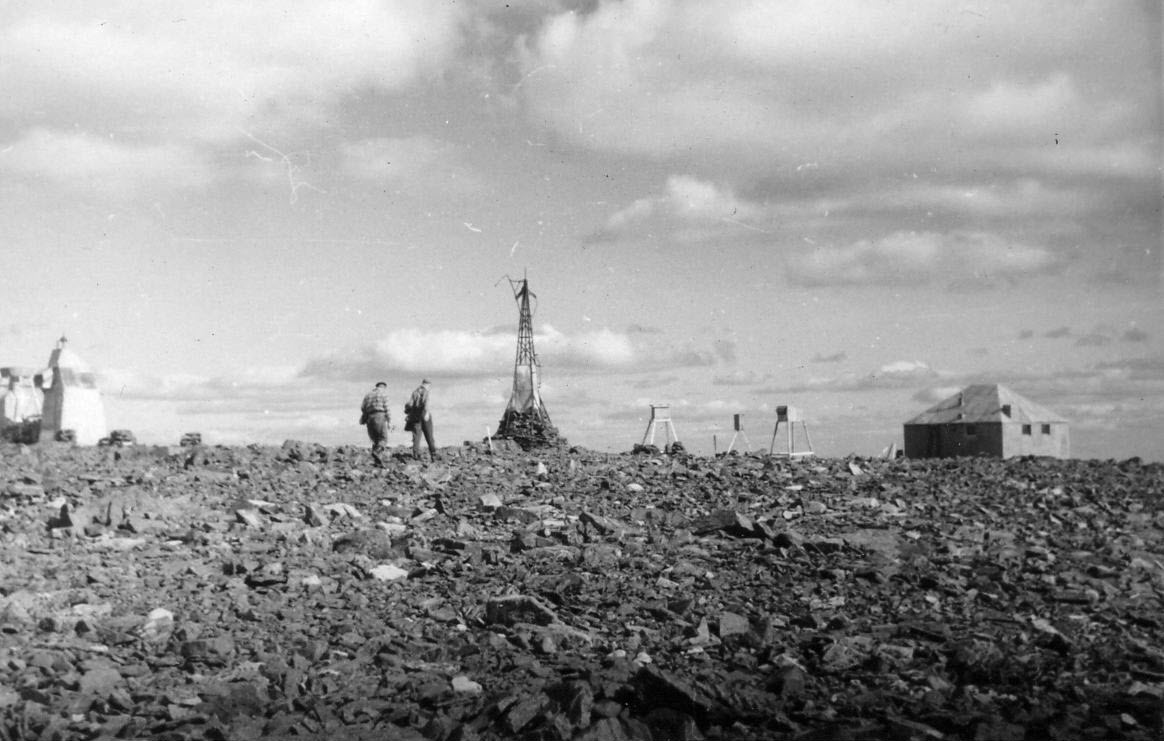
- The Pårtetjåkko observatory
- Born: 1888; Tranemo
- Died: 1982 (aged 93–94)
- Education: University of Uppsala
- Known for: Köhler theory
- Awards: Björkén Prize (1955)
- Scientific career
- Fields: Meteorology
- Institutions: University of Uppsala

Hilding Köhler (1888–1982) was a professor of meteorology at the University of Uppsala in Uppsala, Sweden who performed groundbreaking research in cloud physics. In particular, he performed both theoretical and experimental studies on the growth and condensation of water droplets on hygroscopic nuclei. One important and often quoted result of his theoretical research resulted in the well-known Köhler curve. He also made important contributions to theoretical studies on turbulence in the atmosphere.

== Early life ==
Hilding Köhler was born in Tranemo in 1888, the son of Agnes Hulteni Fredrika Molander and Anders Leonard Köhler. His father was a school-teacher who was born Anders Leonard Johannisson, but changed his name to Köhler when attending the school-teacher seminar. The reason for this change is not known. The family moved to Borås in 1901 so that Hilding could attend the gymnasium there. He finished his studies at the "Latin-läroverket" in 1909. The same year he started his studies at the University of Uppsala and obtained his fil.kand diploma in 1912 and his fil.mag in 1913. The following year (1914) he accepted an offer by Axel Hamberg to be assistant at the newly established meteorological observatory on the Pårtetjåkko mountain north of Kvikkjokk in the region known as Sarek, now a national park. While living in the clouds and with snow and ice, his interest turned to the study of this environment.

== Pårtetjåkko ==
Köhler's interest in cloud physics started while in the years 1914-1916 he was first assistant and later director (observator) of the meteorological observatory on top of Pårtetjåkko at 1830 meter altitude in the Sarek region in northern Sweden. The building erected by Axel Hamberg in 1911 together with four other similar but smaller buildings along the route to the weather station: the Pårek, Skårkas, Tjågnoris (moved to Jokkmokk in 1947) and Litnok-buildings. They were all constructed of sheet-metal (iron) on wooden-frames. See also ref for a very informative article of Hamberg's Sarek-buildings including the Hydro-meteorographs.

During the years 1917-1918 he was an assistant at the Nautisk-Meteorologiska office in Stockholm.

== Haldde ==
From late 1918 until 1926 Köhler was the director of the Haldde observatory. It is located on top Haldde-fjaellet, 900 meters above the Alta-fjord. He made measurements of evaporation and condensation on snowsurfaces.

== Uppsala ==
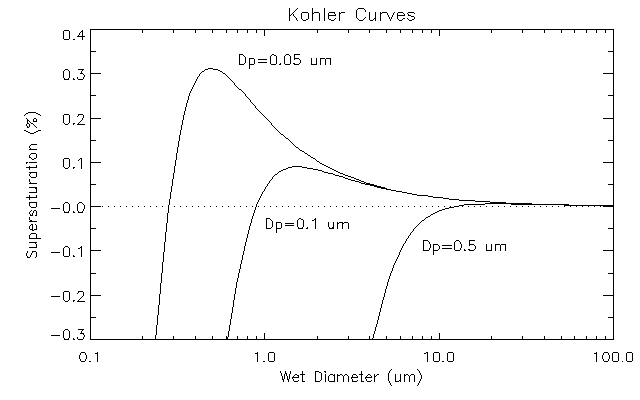
Curves from Köhler theory showing how the critical diameter and supersaturation are dependent upon the amount of solute in the cloud condensation nuclei. It's assumed here that the solute is a perfect sphere of sodium chloride.

He received dispens for his D Sc (Ph D) degree at the University of Uppsala in 1925 while still in Norway. He left the following year with the closure of the Haldde observatory (after a short time in Tromsö) to become 'docent' at the Meteorological Institute in Uppsala and was elected professor in 1936 to succeed Filip Åkerblom. The institute was at this time located in the 'Observatorieparken' since the late 19th century. The professorship did then include an adjacent eight-room house, very suitable for his family of six children and a new wife. The Seismograph housed in an adjacent building was at the time part of the institute. The 'Instrumenthuset', another separate small building housed the Theorell meteorograph an automatic weather station, registering the temperature since 1853.

A new Institute building was on Kōhler's initiative completed in 1949, also located in observatorieparken. During 1947-48 Kŏhler also established an observatory including a 30m high tower in Marsta a small community north about 10 km north of Uppsala. Wind-speeds and temperature were measured and registered at several heights at the tower. Instruments were mostly built in the workshop at the Uppsala Institute. The tower was considered unsafe in the 1980s because of corrosion and subsequently demolished.

A second professorship in meteorology to specialize on weather prognosis was on Köhler's recommendation instituted and upheld by Tor Bergeron in 1949. The institute had 2-3 positions at the level of assistant. These had jour-duty associated with making weather observations that included calibrating the thermometer readings of the 'Theorell'. The institute has its roots in the works of Anders Celsius and Köhler had a keen interest in supporting this heritage and the daily observations was part of this.and so was the care-taking of original records and instruments including the Celsius thermometer. One example of his historical interest was his paper on the 'older history of the thermometer'.

The snow and cloud investigations on Pårtetjåkko and Haldde now resulted in several publications as well as theoretical aspects of these investigations. The chlorine in form of salts (in particular sodium-chlorate) in the fog and clouds as well as droplet-sizes was the subject of his 1933 article ref. Another work on the similar subject but now also including an analysis of the chlorine content in sea-water The aim of this study was to prove (or disprove) that the nuclei of condensation in the clouds had the same composition as that of the sea-water which led to the Köhler theory.

He was also interested in climatology and acquired a Dobson ozone spectrophotometer collecting data 1951–1986.

== Honors and awards ==
- Member of Royal Swedish Academy of Sciences (elected 1947)
- Member Finska Vetenskaps-societeten
- Member Deutsche Akademie der Wissenschaften
- Member Metorologiska och Hydrologiska Rådet (1945–1954)
- Member Royal Meteorological Society (London)
- International Ozon-committee (1950–1958)
- Kommedör of the Nordstjärneorden
