= Kelvin equation =

Equation describing vapor pressure

The Kelvin equation describes the change in vapour pressure due to a curved liquid–vapor interface, such as the surface of a droplet. The vapor pressure at a convex surface is higher than that at a flat surface. The Kelvin equation is dependent upon thermodynamic principles and does not allude to special properties of materials. It is also used for determination of pore size distribution of a porous medium using adsorption porosimetry. The equation is named in honor of William Thomson, also known as Lord Kelvin.

== Formulation ==
The original form of the Kelvin equation, published in 1871, is:
$$p(r_1 , r_2) = P - \frac {\gamma\, \rho _{\rm vapor} } {(\rho_{\rm liquid} - \rho_{\rm vapor})} \left ( \frac {1}{r_1} + \frac {1}{r_2} \right ),$$
where:

- $p(r)$ = vapor pressure at a curved interface of radius $r$
- $P$ = vapor pressure at flat interface ($r = \infty$) = $p_{eq}$
- $\gamma$ = surface tension
- $\rho _{\rm vapor}$ = density of vapor
- $\rho _{\rm liquid}$ = density of liquid
- $r_1$ , $r_2$ = radii of curvature along the principal sections of the curved interface.

This may be written in the following form, known as the Ostwald–Freundlich equation:
$$\ln \frac{p}{p_{\rm sat}} = \frac{2 \gamma V_\text{m}}{rRT},$$
where $p$ is the actual vapour pressure, $p_{\rm sat}$ is the saturated vapour pressure when the surface is flat, $\gamma$ is the liquid/vapor surface tension, $V_\text{m}$ is the molar volume of the liquid, $R$ is the universal gas constant, $r$ is the radius of the droplet, and $T$ is temperature.

Equilibrium vapor pressure depends on droplet size.

- If the curvature is convex, $r$ is positive, then $p > p_{\rm sat}$
- If the curvature is concave, $r$ is negative, then $p < p_{\rm sat}$

As $r$ increases, $p$ decreases towards $p_{sat}$, and the droplets grow into bulk liquid.

If the vapour is cooled, then $T$ decreases, but so does $p_{\rm sat}$. This means $p/p_{\rm sat}$ increases as the liquid is cooled. $\gamma$ and $V_\text{m}$ may be treated as approximately fixed, which means that the critical radius $r$ must also decrease. The further a vapour is supercooled, the smaller the critical radius becomes. Ultimately it can become as small as a few molecules, and the liquid undergoes homogeneous nucleation and growth.

A system containing a pure homogeneous vapour and liquid in equilibrium. In a thought experiment, a non-wetting tube is inserted into the liquid, causing the liquid in the tube to move downwards. The vapour pressure above the curved interface is then higher than that for the planar interface. This picture provides a simple conceptual basis for the Kelvin equation.

The change in vapor pressure can be attributed to changes in the Laplace pressure. When the Laplace pressure rises in a droplet, the droplet tends to evaporate more easily.

When applying the Kelvin equation, two cases must be distinguished: A drop of liquid in its own vapor will result in a convex liquid surface, and a bubble of vapor in a liquid will result in a concave liquid surface.

== History ==
The form of the Kelvin equation here is not the form in which it appeared in Lord Kelvin's article of 1871. The derivation of the form that appears in this article from Kelvin's original equation was presented by Robert von Helmholtz (son of German physicist Hermann von Helmholtz) in his dissertation of 1885. In 2020, researchers found that the equation was accurate down to the 1nm scale.

== Derivation using the Gibbs free energy ==
The formal definition of the Gibbs free energy for a parcel of volume $V$, pressure $P$ and temperature $T$ is given by:

$$G=U+pV-TS,$$

where $U$ is the internal energy and $S$ is the entropy. The differential form of the Gibbs free energy can be given as

$$dG=-S dT + V dP + \sum_{i=1}^ k \mu_i dn_i,$$

where $\mu$ is the chemical potential and $n$ is the number of moles. Suppose we have a substance $x$ which contains no impurities. Let's consider the formation of a single drop of $x$ with radius $r$ containing $n_x$ molecules from its pure vapor. The change in the Gibbs free energy due to this process is

$$\Delta G = G_d - G_v,$$

where $G_d$ and $G_v$ are the Gibbs energies of the drop and vapor respectively. Suppose we have $N_i$ molecules in the vapor phase initially. After the formation of the drop, this number decreases to $N_f$, where

$$N_f = N_i - n_x.$$

Let $g_v$ and $g_l$ represent the Gibbs free energy of a molecule in the vapor and liquid phase respectively. The change in the Gibbs free energy is then:

$$\Delta G = N_f g_v + n_x g_l + 4 \pi r^2 \sigma - N_i g_v,$$

where $4 \pi r^2 \sigma$ is the Gibbs free energy associated with an interface with radius of curvature $r$ and surface tension $\sigma$. The equation can be rearranged to give

$$\Delta G= (N_i - n_x) g_v + n_x g_l + 4 \pi r^2 \sigma - N_i g_v = n_x (g_l - g_v ) + 4 \pi r^2 \sigma .$$

Let $v_l$ and $v_v$ be the volume occupied by one molecule in the liquid phase and vapor phase respectively. If the drop is considered to be spherical, then

$$n_x v_l = \frac{4}{3} \pi r^3.$$

The number of molecules in the drop is then given by

$$n_x  = \frac{4 \pi r^3 }{3 v_l}.$$

The change in Gibbs energy is then

$$\Delta G = \frac{4 \pi r^3 }{3 v_l} (g_l - g_v) + 4 \pi r^2 \sigma .$$

The differential form of the Gibbs free energy of one molecule at constant temperature and constant number of molecules can be given by:

$$dg = (v_l - v_v ) dP.$$

If we assume that $v_v \gg v_l$ then

$$dg \simeq - v_v dP.$$

The vapor phase is also assumed to behave like an ideal gas, so

$$v_v = \frac{k T}{P},$$

where $k$ is the Boltzmann constant. Thus, the change in the Gibbs free energy for one molecule is

$$\Delta g = - k T \int\limits_{P_{sat}}^{P} \frac {dP}{P},$$

where $P_{sat}$ is the saturated vapor pressure of $x$ over a flat surface and $P$ is the actual vapor pressure over the liquid. Solving the integral, we have

$$\Delta g = g_l - g_v = -k T \ln \Bigl( \frac{P}{P_{sat}}\Bigr).$$

The change in the Gibbs free energy following the formation of the drop is then

$$\Delta G =- \frac{ 4}{3} \pi r^3 \frac{k T}{v_l} \ln \Bigl(\frac{P}{P_{sat}} \Bigr) + 4 \pi r^2 \sigma .$$

The derivative of this equation with respect to $r$ is

$$\frac{\partial\bigl( \Delta G\bigr)}{\partial r} = -4 \pi r^2 \frac{ k T}{v_l} \ln \Bigl(\frac{P}{P_{sat}}\Bigr) + 8 \pi r \sigma .$$

The maximum value occurs when the derivative equals zero. The radius corresponding to this value is:

$$r = \frac{2 v_l \sigma }{kT \ln \Bigl(\frac{P}{P_{sat}} \Bigr)}.$$

Rearranging this equation gives the Ostwald–Freundlich form of the Kelvin equation:

$$\ln \Bigl(\frac{P}{P_{sat}} \Bigr) = \frac{2 v_l \sigma}{rkT}.$$

== Apparent paradox ==
An equation similar to that of Kelvin can be derived for the solubility of small particles or droplets in a liquid, by means of the connection between vapour pressure and solubility, thus the Kelvin equation also applies to solids, to slightly soluble liquids, and their solutions if the partial pressure $p$ is replaced by the solubility of the solid ($c$) (or a second liquid) at the given radius, $r$, and $p_{\rm sat}$ by the solubility at a plane surface ($c_{\rm sat}$). Hence small particles (like small droplets) are more soluble than larger ones. The equation would then be given by:

$$\ln \frac{c}{c_{\rm sat}}= \frac{2 \gamma V_\text{m}}{rRT}.$$

These results led to the problem of how new phases can ever arise from old ones. For example, if a container filled with water vapour at slightly below the saturation pressure is suddenly cooled, perhaps by adiabatic expansion, as in a cloud chamber, the vapour may become supersaturated with respect to liquid water. It is then in a metastable state, and we may expect condensation to take place. A reasonable molecular model of condensation would seem to be that two or three molecules of water vapour come together to form a tiny droplet, and that this nucleus of condensation then grows by accretion, as additional vapour molecules happen to hit it. The Kelvin equation, however, indicates that a tiny droplet like this nucleus, being only a few ångströms in diameter, would have a vapour pressure many times that of the bulk liquid. As far as tiny nuclei are concerned, the vapour would not be supersaturated at all. Such nuclei should immediately re-evaporate, and the emergence of a new phase at the equilibrium pressure, or even moderately above it should be impossible. Hence, the over-saturation must be several times higher than the normal saturation value for spontaneous nucleation to occur.

There are two ways of resolving this paradox. In the first place, we know the statistical basis of the second law of thermodynamics. In any system at equilibrium, there are always fluctuations around the equilibrium condition, and if the system contains few molecules, these fluctuations may be relatively large. There is always a chance that an appropriate fluctuation may lead to the formation of a nucleus of a new phase, even though the tiny nucleus could be called thermodynamically unstable. The chance of a fluctuation is e^{−ΔS/k}, where ΔS is the deviation of the entropy from the equilibrium value.

It is unlikely, however, that new phases often arise by this fluctuation mechanism and the resultant spontaneous nucleation. Calculations show that the chance, e^{−ΔS/k}, is usually too small. It is more likely that tiny dust particles act as nuclei in supersaturated vapours or solutions. In the cloud chamber, it is the clusters of ions caused by a passing high-energy particle that acts as nucleation centers. Actually, vapours seem to be much less finicky than solutions about the sort of nuclei required. This is because a liquid will condense on almost any surface, but crystallization requires the presence of crystal faces of the proper kind.

For a sessile drop residing on a solid surface, the Kelvin equation is modified near the contact line, due to intermolecular interactions between the liquid drop and the solid surface. This extended Kelvin equation is given by

$$\ln \frac{c}{c_{\rm sat}}= \frac{V_\text{m}}{RT} \left(\frac{2 \gamma}{r} + \Pi\right).$$

where $\Pi$ is the disjoining pressure that accounts for the intermolecular interactions between the sessile drop and the solid and $\left(2 \gamma/r \right)$ is the Laplace pressure, accounting for the curvature-induced pressure inside the liquid drop. When the interactions are attractive in nature, the disjoining pressure, $\Pi$ is negative. Near the contact line, the disjoining pressure dominates over the Laplace pressure, implying that the solubility, $c$ is less than $c_{\rm sat}$. This implies that a new phase can spontaneously grow on a solid surface, even under saturation conditions.

== See also ==
- Condensation
- Gibbs–Thomson equation
- Ostwald–Freundlich equation
