= Sievert (disambiguation) =

The sievert (symbol: Sv) is the SI derived unit of ionizing radiation dose

Sievert may also refer to:

- Sievert (name), German given name and surname

== Science and technology ==
- Sievert chamber, an ionization chamber used in radiation dose measurements
- Sievert integral, function commonly used in radiation transport calculations

== See also ==
- Sieverts (disambiguation)
