= Sieverts =

Sieverts (symbol: Sv) is plural for the SI unit of equivalent absorbed radiation dose

Sieverts may also refer to:

- Adolf Sieverts (1874–1947), German chemist
  - Sieverts's law, rule to predict the solubility of gases in metals
- Rudolf Sieverts (1903–1980), German Law professor
- Thomas Sieverts (born 1934), German architect

== See also ==
- Sievert (disambiguation)
