= Otto Wallach =

German chemist (1847–1931)

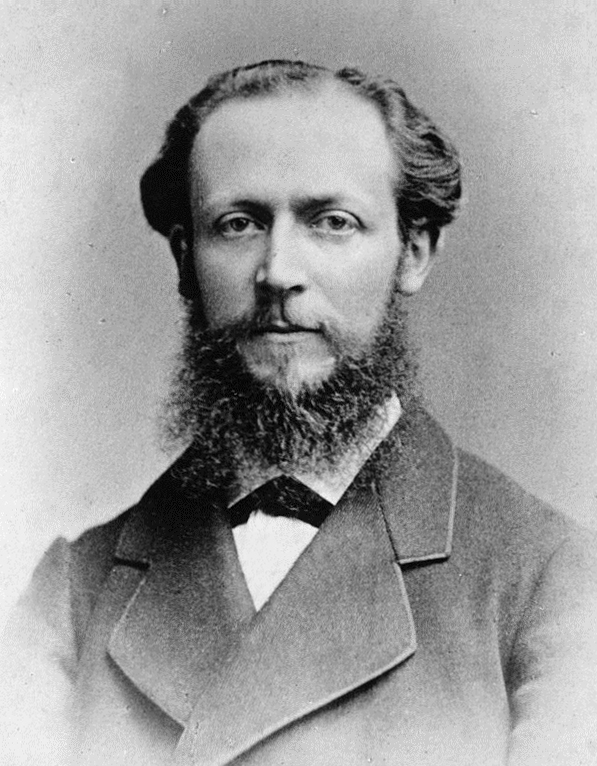
- Wallach c. 1873
- Born: 27 March 1847; Königsberg, Prussia
- Died: 26 February 1931 (aged 83); Göttingen, Germany
- Education: University of Göttingen
- Known for: Alicyclic compounds Wallach degradation Wallach rearrangement Wallach's rule Leuckart–Wallach reaction
- Awards: Davy Medal (1912); Nobel Prize for Chemistry (1910); Cothenius Medal (1889)
- Scientific career
- Fields: Organic chemistry
- Workplaces: University of Göttingen, University of Bonn
- Doctoral advisor: Hans Hübner
- Doctoral students: Walter Haworth, Adolf Sieverts

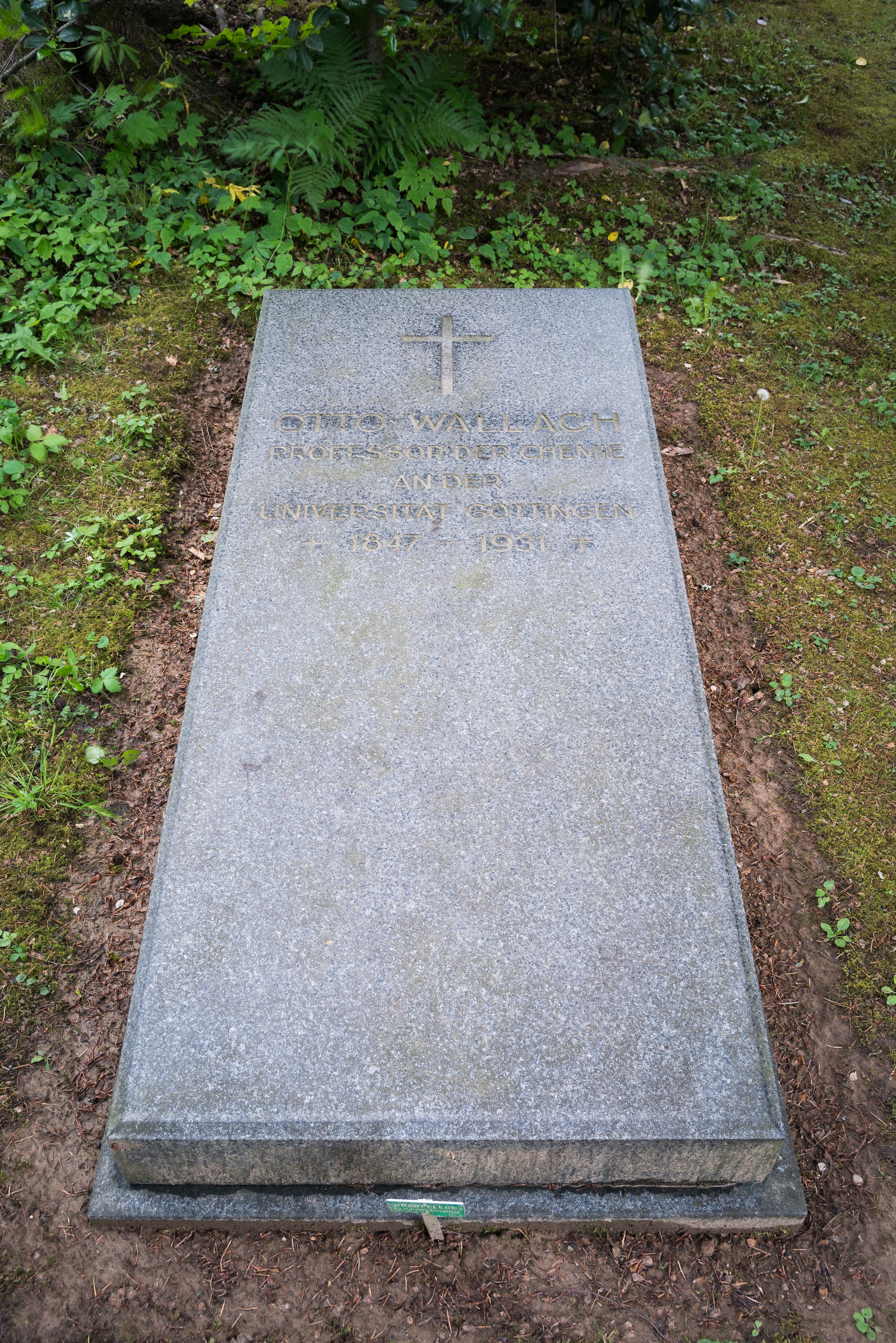
Otto Wallach's grave in Göttingen

Otto Wallach (German pronunciation: [ˈɔto ˈvalax]; 27 March 1847 – 26 February 1931) was a German chemist and recipient of the 1910 Nobel Prize in Chemistry for his work on alicyclic compounds.

== Biography ==
Wallach was born in Königsberg, the son of a Prussian civil servant. His father, Gerhard Wallach, descended from a Jewish family that had converted to Lutheranism. His mother, Otillie (Thoma), was an ethnic German of Protestant religion. Wallach's father was transferred to Stettin (Szczecin) and later to Potsdam. Otto Wallach went to school, a Gymnasium, in Potsdam, where he learned about literature and the history of art, two subjects he was interested his whole life. At this time he also started private chemical experiments at the house of his parents.

In 1867 he started studying chemistry at the University of Göttingen, where at this time Friedrich Wöhler was head of organic chemistry. After one semester at the University of Berlin with August Wilhelm von Hofmann, Wallach received his Doctoral degree from the University of Göttingen in 1869, and worked as a professor in the University of Bonn (1870–89) and the University of Göttingen (1889–1915). Two of his doctoral students were Adolf Sieverts and Walter Haworth. Wallach died at Göttingen. In 1912, he was awarded the Davy Medal.

He died on 26 February 1931, and was buried in the Göttingen.

== Major works ==
During his work with Friedrich Kekulé in Bonn he started a systematic analysis of the terpenes present in essential oils. Up to this time only a few had been isolated in pure form, and structural information was sparse. Melting point comparison and the measurement of mixtures was one of the methods to confirm identical substances. For this method the mostly liquid terpenes had to be transformed into crystalline compounds. With stepwise derivatisation, especially additions to the double bond present in some of the terpenes, he achieved the goal of obtaining crystalline compounds. The investigation of the rearrangement reactions of cyclic unsaturated terpenes made it possible to obtain the structure of an unknown terpene by following the rearrangement to a known structure of a terpene. With these principal methods he opened the path to systematic research on terpenes.

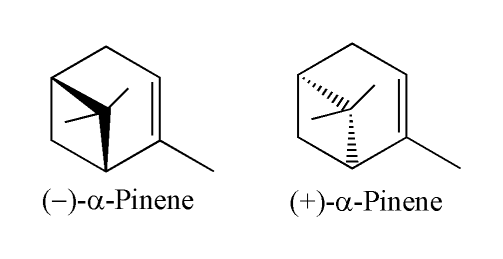

He was responsible for naming terpene and pinene, and for undertaking the first systematic study of pinene.

He wrote a book about the chemistry of terpenes, "Terpene und Campher" (1909).

Otto Wallach is known for Wallach's rule, Wallach degradation, the Leuckart-Wallach reaction (which he developed along with Rudolf Leuckart) and the Wallach rearrangement.

== Works ==
- Tabellen zur chemischen Analyse. Weber, Bonn 1880. Digital edition of the University and State Library Düsseldorf.
  - 1. Verhalten der Elemente und ihrer Verbindungen. 1880
  - 2. Methoden zur Auffindung und Trennung der Elemente. 2. Aufl. von "Hülfstabellen für den chemisch-analytischen Unterricht" 1880
- Terpene und Campher : Zusammenfassung eigener Untersuchungen auf dem Gebiet der alicyclischen Kohlenstoffverbindungen. 2. Aufl. Leipzig : von Veit, 1914. Digital edition of the University and State Library Düsseldorf.

== See also ==
- List of Jewish Nobel laureates
