= Leuckart =

Leuckart is a surname. Notable people with the surname include:

- Friedrich Sigismund Leuckart (1794–1843), German doctor and naturalist
- Rudolf Leuckart (1822–1898), German zoologist
- Rudolf Leuckart (1854–1889), German chemist, son of the Rudolf Leuckart above
