= Oskar Krancher =

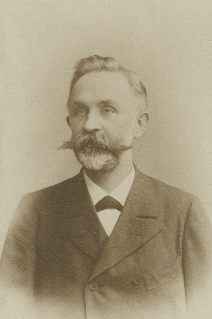

Paul Oskar Krancher (April 11, 1857 – August 18, 1936) was a German entomologist and apiculturist who worked as a highschool teacher at the Ostwaldschule in Leipzig. He wrote several books on beekeeping and published an annual Entomologische Jahrbuch.

== Life and work ==
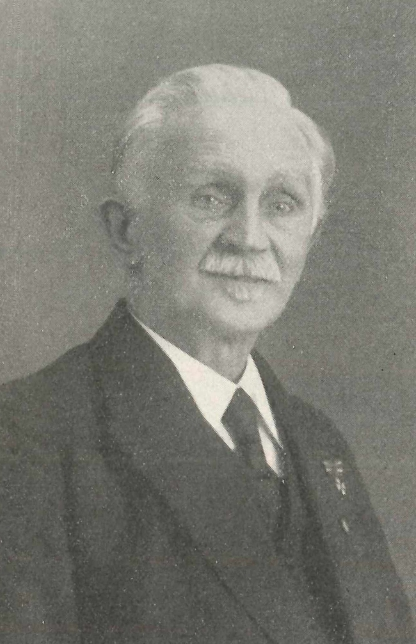
In later life

Krancher was born in Schneeberg and his father was a cantor at Dittersbach near Frankenberg. He became familiar with beekeeping at an early age as his father Ludwig was involved in promoting beekeeping. He was educated at the Realschule in Crimmitschau and gymnasium at Zwickau before going to the University of Leipzig in 1876. He received a doctorate in 1881 under Rudolf Leuckart with a dissertation on the structure of the spiracles ("stigmen") in insects. He then worked as a teacher in Leipzig and in his spare time he studied ornithology and entomology. He began to publish a yearbook of entomology that he began in 1892 and kept up until his death. He published a calendar for beekeepers from 1888 to 1915 and from 1910 he gave courses in beekeeping at the University of Leipzig. He published a large number of book reviews and popular scientific articles (nearly 2000 in 1927 according to him). He retired in 1935. Krancher published numerous books on beekeeping including a compact encyclopaedia of beekeeping and apiculture in 1903.
