= Sievert (name) =

Sievert is a low German given name or a surname.

== Variants ==
- Danish: Sivart, Sivert
- Faroese: Sívar
- Norwegian: Siver, Sivert, Syver, Syvert
- Swedish: Sifuert, Sivar, Sivard, Siver, Sivert, Severt, Sigvard, Sigurd

== Origin and meaning ==
The name Sievert is the low German version of the name Siegward. Both names descend from the old high German terms "sigu" (victory) and "wart" (guardian).

== Saint's days ==
- Sweden: 25 February (Sivert)
- Norway: 2 April (Sivert)

== Notable people ==
=== Surname ===
- Claus Sievert (1949–2009), German-born American printmaker and illustrator
- Hans-Heinrich Sievert (1909–1963), German decathlete
- Helmut Sievert (1914–1945), German footballer
- Jacqueline Sievert (born 1956), Swiss gymnast
- José Joaquín Chaverri Sievert (born 1949), Costa Rican diplomat
- Mike Sievert (born 1969), American business executive
- Paul Sievert (1895–1988), German racewalker
- Rolf Maximilian Sievert (1896–1966), Swedish physicist

=== Given name ===
- Sievert Allen Rohwer (1887–1951), American entomologist
