= Sivert =

Sivert is a Scandinavian male name, a variant of Sigvard and Siward. It may refer to:

- Sivert Guttorm Bakken (1998–2025), Norwegian biathlete
- Sivert Høyem (born 1976), Norwegian singer
- Sivert Langholm (1927–2022), Norwegian historian
- Sivert Mannsverk (born 2002), Norwegian footballer
- Sivert Mattsson (1907–1999), Swedish cross country skier
- Sivert Andreas Nielsen (1916–2004), Norwegian civil servant, banker and politician
- Sivert Andreas Nielsen (1823–1904), Norwegian politician for the Liberal Party
- Sivert Samuelson (1883–1958), South African cricketer
- Sivert Christensen Strøm (1819–1902), Norwegian jurist and politician
- Sivert Todal (1904–1988), Norwegian politician

== See also ==
- Sievert (name)
- Sigurd
