= Graham's law =

Empirical thermodynamic model of gas-transport phenomenon

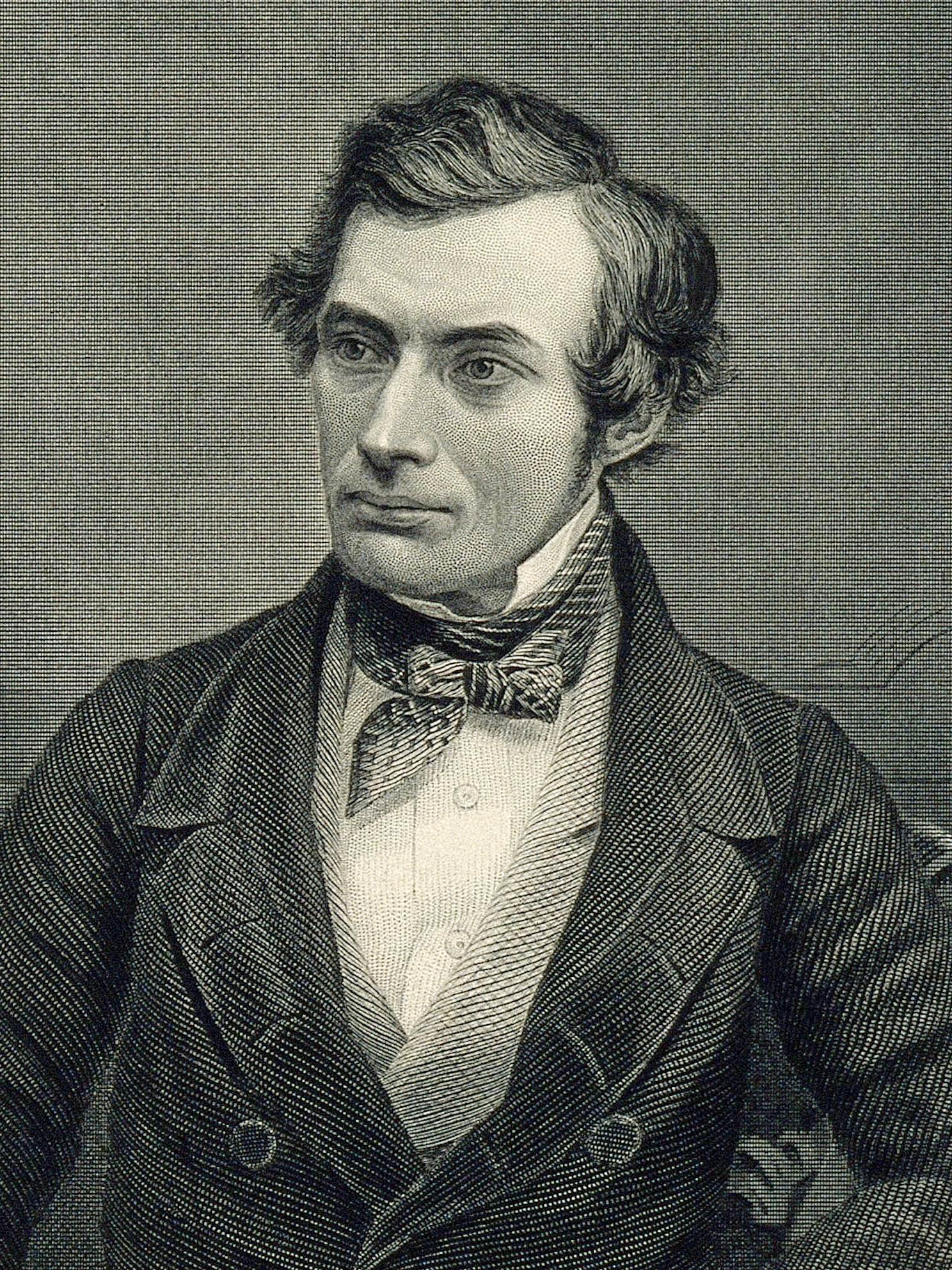
Thomas Graham

Graham's law of effusion (also called Graham's law of diffusion) was formulated by Scottish physical chemist Thomas Graham in 1848. Graham found experimentally that the rate of effusion of a gas is inversely proportional to the square root of the molar mass of its particles. This formula is stated as
$$\frac{\text{rate}_1}{\text{rate}_2} = \sqrt{\frac{M_2}{M_1}},$$
where

rate_{1} is the rate of effusion for the first gas (volume or number of moles per unit time),
rate_{2} is the rate of effusion for the second gas,
M_{1} is the molar mass of gas 1,
M_{2} is the molar mass of gas 2.

Graham's law states that the rate of diffusion or of effusion of a gas is inversely proportional to the square root of its molecular weight. Thus, if the molecular weight of one gas is four times that of another, it would diffuse through a porous plug or escape through a small pinhole in a vessel at half the rate of the other (heavier gases diffuse more slowly). A complete theoretical explanation of Graham's law was provided years later by the kinetic theory of gases. Graham's law provides a basis for separating isotopes by diffusion—a method that came to play a crucial role in the development of the atomic bomb.

Graham's law is most accurate for molecular effusion which involves the movement of one gas at a time through a hole. It is only approximate for diffusion of one gas in another or in air, as these processes involve the movement of more than one gas.

In the same conditions of temperature and pressure, the molar mass is proportional to the mass density. Therefore, the rates of diffusion of different gases are inversely proportional to the square roots of their mass densities:
$$\text{rate} \propto \frac{1}{\sqrt{\rho}},$$
where ρ is the mass density.

== Examples ==
First example: Let gas 1 be H_{2}, and gas 2 be O_{2}. This example is solving for the ratio between the rates of the two gases:

$$\frac{\text{rate}(\ce{H2})}{\text{rate}(\ce{O2})} =
\sqrt{\frac{M(\ce{O2})}{M(\ce{H2})}} =
\frac{\sqrt{32}}{\sqrt{2}} =
\sqrt{16} = 4.$$

Therefore, hydrogen molecules effuse four times faster than oxygen molecules.

Graham's law can also be used to approximately determine the molecular weight of a gas if one gas is a known species and there is a specific ratio between the rates of two gases (as in the previous example). The equation can be solved for the unknown molecular weight:

$$M_2 = \left(\frac{\text{rate}_1}{\text{rate}_2}\right)^2 M_1.$$

Graham's law was the basis for separating uranium-235 from uranium-238 found in natural uraninite (uranium ore) during the Manhattan Project to build the first atomic bomb. The United States government built a gaseous diffusion plant at the Clinton Engineer Works in Oak Ridge, Tennessee, at the cost of $479 million (equivalent to $6.61 billion in 2024). In this plant, yellowcake, uranium concentrate recovered from the leaching of uranium ore, was first converted to volatile uranium hexafluoride. UF_{6} was then heated in the vapor state and repeatedly forced to diffuse through porous barriers, each time becoming a little more enriched in the slightly lighter uranium-235 isotope.

Second example: An unknown gas diffuses 0.25 times as fast as He. What is the molar mass of the unknown gas?

Using the formula of gaseous diffusion, we can set up the equation

$$0.25 = \frac{\text{rate}_\text{unknown}}{\text{rate}_\text{He}} = \frac{\sqrt{4~\text{g/mol}}}{\sqrt{M_2}}.$$

Rearranging the equation results in

$$M_2 = \left(\frac{\sqrt{4~\text{g/mol}}}{0.25}\right)^2 = 64~\text{g/mol}.$$

An inorganic gas with a molar mass of 64g/mol is SO_{2}: MW = 32 + (2×16) = 64g/mol.

== History ==
Graham's research on the diffusion of gases was triggered by his reading about the observations of German chemist Johann Döbereiner that hydrogen gas diffused out of a small crack in a glass bottle faster than the surrounding air diffused in to replace it. Graham measured the rate of diffusion of gases through porous plaster plugs, through very fine tubes, and through small orifices. In this way he slowed down the process so that it could be studied quantitatively. He first stated in 1831 that the rate of effusion of a gas is inversely proportional to the square root of its density, and later in 1848 showed that this rate is inversely proportional to the square root of the molar mass. Graham went on to study the diffusion of substances in solution and in the process made the discovery that some apparent solutions actually are suspensions of particles too large to pass through a parchment filter. He termed these materials colloids, a term that has come to denote an important class of finely divided materials.

Around the time Graham did his work, the concept of molecular weight was being established largely through the measurements of gases. Daniel Bernoulli suggested in 1738 in his book Hydrodynamica that heat increases in proportion to the velocity, and thus kinetic energy, of gas particles. Italian physicist Amedeo Avogadro also suggested in 1811 that equal volumes of different gases contain equal numbers of molecules. Thus, the relative molecular weights of two gases are equal to the ratio of weights of equal volumes of the gases. Avogadro's insight, together with other studies of gas behaviour provided a basis for later theoretical work by Scottish physicist James Clerk Maxwell to explain the properties of gases as collections of small particles moving through largely empty space.

Perhaps the greatest success of the kinetic theory of gases, as it came to be called, was the discovery that for gases, the temperature as measured on the Kelvin (absolute) temperature scale is directly proportional to the average kinetic energy of the gas molecules. Graham's law for diffusion could thus be understood as a consequence of the molecular kinetic energies being equal at the same temperature.

The rationale of the above can be summed up as follows:

Kinetic energy of each type of particle (in this example, hydrogen and oxygen, as above) within the system is equal, as defined by thermodynamic temperature:

$$\frac{1}{2} m_{\ce{H2}} v^2_{\ce{H2}} =
\frac{1}{2} m_{\ce{O2}} v^2_{\ce{O2}},$$

which can be simplified and rearranged to

$$\frac{v^2_{\ce{H2}}}{v^2_{\ce{O2}}} =
\frac{m_{\ce{O2}}}{m_{\ce{H2}}},$$

or

$$\frac{v_{\ce{H2}}}{v_{\ce{O2}}} =
\sqrt{\frac{m_{\ce{O2}}}{m_{\ce{H2}}}}.$$

Therefore, when constraining the system to the passage of particles through an area, Graham's law appears as written at the start of this article.

== See also ==
- Sieverts' law
- Henry's law
- Gas laws
- Scientific laws named after people
- Viscosity
- Drag (physics)
- Vapour Density
