= Leuckart thiophenol reaction =

Named after	Rudolf Leuckart
Reaction type	Substitution reaction

Identifiers
Organic Chemistry Portal	leuckart-thiophenol-reaction

The Leuckart thiophenol reaction is the decomposition of a diazoxanthate, by gentle warming in a slightly acidic cuprous medium, to its corresponding aryl xanthates which give arenethiols on alkaline hydrolysis and aryl sulfides on further warming.

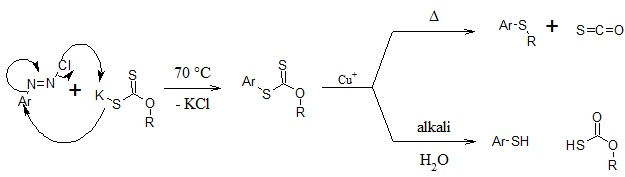

This reaction was first reported by Rudolf Leuckart in 1890.

== Key Points ==
The reaction provides a route to introduce Sulfur into aromatic rings.

Products: Arenethiols and Aryl sulfides.

Cu(I) acts as a catalyst to facilitate the decomposition of the diazo intermediate.

== Applications ==
Preparation of Arenethiols (Ar–SH): Important in Pharmaceuticals, Dyes, and Agrochemicals.

Synthesis of Aryl sulfides (Ar–S–Ar): Used in Polymers, Drugs, Materials Chemistry.

Substitution of diazonium salts with sulfur groups, expanding the Sandmeyer-type transformations.
