= Sievert chamber =

A Sievert chamber is a type of ionization chamber used in radiation dose measurements. It was invented by Professor Rolf Maximilian Sievert in Sweden in the years 1920–40.

== See also ==
- Geiger–Müller tube
- Ionization chamber
- Dosimetry
