= Adolf Sieverts =

German chemist (1874–1947)

- Born: 7 October 1874; Hamburg, Germany
- Died: 8 January 1947 (aged 72); Jena, Germany
- Citizenship: German
- Education: University of Göttingen
- Known for: Sieverts's law
- Scientific career
- Fields: Chemistry
- Doctoral advisor: Otto Wallach
- Doctoral students: Harald Schäfer

Adolf Ferdinand Sieverts (7 October 1874 – 8 January 1947) was a German chemist, best known for his work on solubility of gases in metals. He originated Sieverts's law. He was a doctoral student of Otto Wallach.
