= Henry adsorption constant =

Constant in chemistry

The Henry adsorption constant is the constant appearing in the linear adsorption isotherm, which formally resembles Henry's law; therefore, it is also called Henry's adsorption isotherm. It is named after British chemist William Henry. This is the simplest adsorption isotherm in that the amount of the surface adsorbate is represented to be proportional to the partial pressure of the adsorptive gas:

$$X = K_H P$$

where:

- X - surface coverage,
- P - partial pressure,
- K_{H} - Henry's adsorption constant.

For solutions, concentrations, or activities, are used instead of the partial pressures.

The linear isotherm can be used to describe the initial part of many practical isotherms. It is typically taken as valid for low surface coverages, and the adsorption energy being independent of the coverage (lack of inhomogeneities on the surface).

The Henry adsorption constant can be defined as:

$$K_H = \lim_{\varrho\rightarrow 0} \frac{\varrho_s}{\varrho(z)},$$

where:

- $\varrho(z)$ is the number density at free phase,
- $\varrho_s$ is the surface number density,

== Application at a permeable wall ==
If a solid body is modeled by a constant field and the structure of the field is such that it has a penetrable core, then

$$K_H =  \int\limits_{-\infty}^{x'} \big [ \exp(-\beta u) - \exp(-\beta u_0) \big ] dx
- \int\limits_{x'}^{\infty} \big [ 1 - \exp(-\beta u) \big ] dx.$$

Here $x'$ is the position of the dividing surface, $u = u(x)$ is the external force field, simulating a solid, $u_0$ is the field value deep in the solid, $\beta = 1/ k_B T$, $k_B$ is the Boltzmann constant, and $T$ is the temperature.

Introducing "the surface of zero adsorption"

$$x_0 = - \int\limits_{-\infty}^{0} \widetilde{\theta}(x) dx + \int\limits_{0}^{\infty} \widetilde{\varphi}(x) dx,$$

where

$$\widetilde{\theta} = \frac{\exp {(- \beta u)} - \exp {(- \beta u_0)}}{1 - \exp {(- \beta u_0)}}$$

and

$$\widetilde{\varphi} = \frac{1 - \exp {(- \beta u)} }{1 - \exp {(- \beta u_0)}},$$

we get

$$K_H(x') = [x' - x_0(T)][1 - \exp(-\beta u_0)]$$

and the problem of $K_H$ determination is reduced to the calculation of $x_0$.

Taking into account that for Henry absorption constant we have

$$k_H = \lim_{\varrho\rightarrow 0} \frac{\varrho(z')}{\varrho(z)} = \exp(-\beta u_0),$$

where $\varrho(z')$ is the number density inside the solid, we arrive at the parametric dependence

$$K_H =  \int\limits_{-\infty}^{x'}\big [ k_H^{ \widetilde{u}(x)} - k_H\big ] dx - \int\limits_{x'}^{\infty}\big [ 1 - k_H^{\widetilde{u}(x)}\big ] dx$$

where

$$\widetilde{u}(x) = \frac{u(x)}{u_0}.$$

== Application at a static membrane ==
If a static membrane is modeled by a constant field and the structure of the field is such that it has a penetrable core and vanishes when $x = \pm\infty$, then

$$K_H =  \int\limits_{-\infty}^{\infty} \big [ \exp(-\beta u) - 1 \big ] dx.$$

We see that in this case the $K_H$ sign and value depend on the potential $u$ and temperature only.

== Application at an impermeable wall ==
If a solid body is modeled by a constant hard-core field, then

$$K_H =  \int\limits_{-\infty}^{x'}  \exp(-\beta u) dx   - \int\limits_{x'}^{\infty} \big [ 1 - \exp(-\beta u) \big ] dx,$$

or

$$K_H(x') = x' - x_0(T),$$

where

$$x_0 = - \int\limits_{-\infty}^{0} \theta(x) dx + \int\limits_{0}^{\infty} \varphi(x) dx.$$

Here

$$\theta = \exp {(- \beta u)}$$

$$\varphi = 1 - \exp {(- \beta u)}.$$

For the hard solid potential

$$x_0 = x_{step},$$

where $x_{step}$ is the position of the potential discontinuity. So, in this case

$$K_H(x') = x' - x_{step}.$$

== Choice of the dividing surface ==
The choice of the dividing surface, strictly speaking, is arbitrary, however, it is very desirable to take into account the type of external potential $u(x)$. Otherwise, these expressions are at odds with the generally accepted concepts and common sense.

First, $x'$ must lie close to the transition layer (i.e., the region where the number density varies), otherwise it would mean the attribution of the bulk properties of one of the phase to the surface.

Second. In the case of weak adsorption, for example, when the potential is close to the stepwise, it is logical to choose $x'$ close to $x_0$. (In some cases, choosing $x_0\pm R$, where $R$ is particle radius, excluding the "dead" volume.)

In the case of pronounced adsorption it is advisable to choose $x'$ close to the right border of the transition region. In this case all particles from the transition layer will be attributed to the solid, and $K_H$ is always positive. Trying to put $x' = x_0$ in this case will lead to a strong shift of $x'$ to the solid body domain, which is clearly unphysical.

Conversely, if $u_0 < 0$ (fluid on the left), it is advisable to choose $x'$ lying on the left side of the transition layer. In this case the surface particles once again refer to the solid and $K_H$ is back positive.

Thus, except in the case of static membrane, we can always avoid the "negative adsorption" for one-component systems.

== See also ==
- Freundlich equation
- Langmuir adsorption model
- Brunauer–Emmett–Teller (BET) theory
