= Rolf Maximilian Sievert =

Swedish medical physicist (1896–1966)

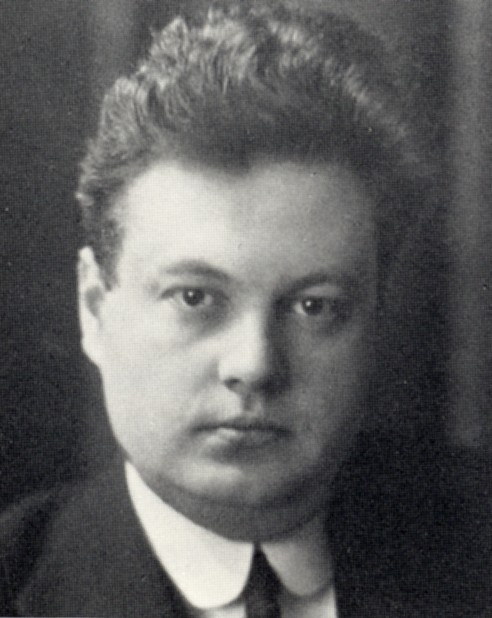
- Born: 6 May 1896; Stockholm, Sweden
- Died: 3 October 1966 (aged 70); Stockholm, Sweden
- Education: Uppsala University (B.S.); Stockholm University (M.S.)
- Occupation: Medical physicist

Rolf Maximilian Sievert (Swedish: [ˈrɔlf maksɪˈmǐːlɪan ˈsǐːvɛʈ]; 6 May 1896 – 3 October 1966) was a Swedish medical physicist whose major contribution was in the study of the biological effects of ionizing radiation.

The sievert (Sv), the SI unit representing the stochastic health risk of ionizing radiation, is named for him. He has been called the "Father of Radiation Protection".

== Biography ==
Sievert was born in Stockholm, Sweden. His parents were Max Sievert and Sofia Carolina Sievert, née Panchéen. In 1881, his father founded the Max Sievert Company in Stockholm.

Sievert served as head of the physics laboratory at Sweden's Radiumhemmet from 1924 to 1937, after which he was appointed head of the department of radiation physics at the Karolinska Institute. He played a pioneering role in the measurement of doses of radiation especially in its use in the diagnosis and treatment of cancer. In later years, he focused his research on the biological effects of repeated exposure to low doses of radiation.

He was a founder of the International X-ray and Radium Protection Committee (IXRPC) in 1928, and served as it first chairman; this later became the ICRP. He also chaired the United Nations Scientific Committee on the Effects of Atomic Radiation (UNSCEAR).

Sievert invented a number of instruments for measuring radiation doses, the most widely known being the Sievert chamber.

== Legacy ==
In 1979, at the Conférence Générale des Poids et Mesures (General Conference on Weights and Measures or CGPM), the SI unit for ionizing radiation dose equivalent was named after him and given the name sievert (Sv).

Sievert had an extensive insect collection and his specimens can be found in the Entomological Museum of Lund University in Sweden.

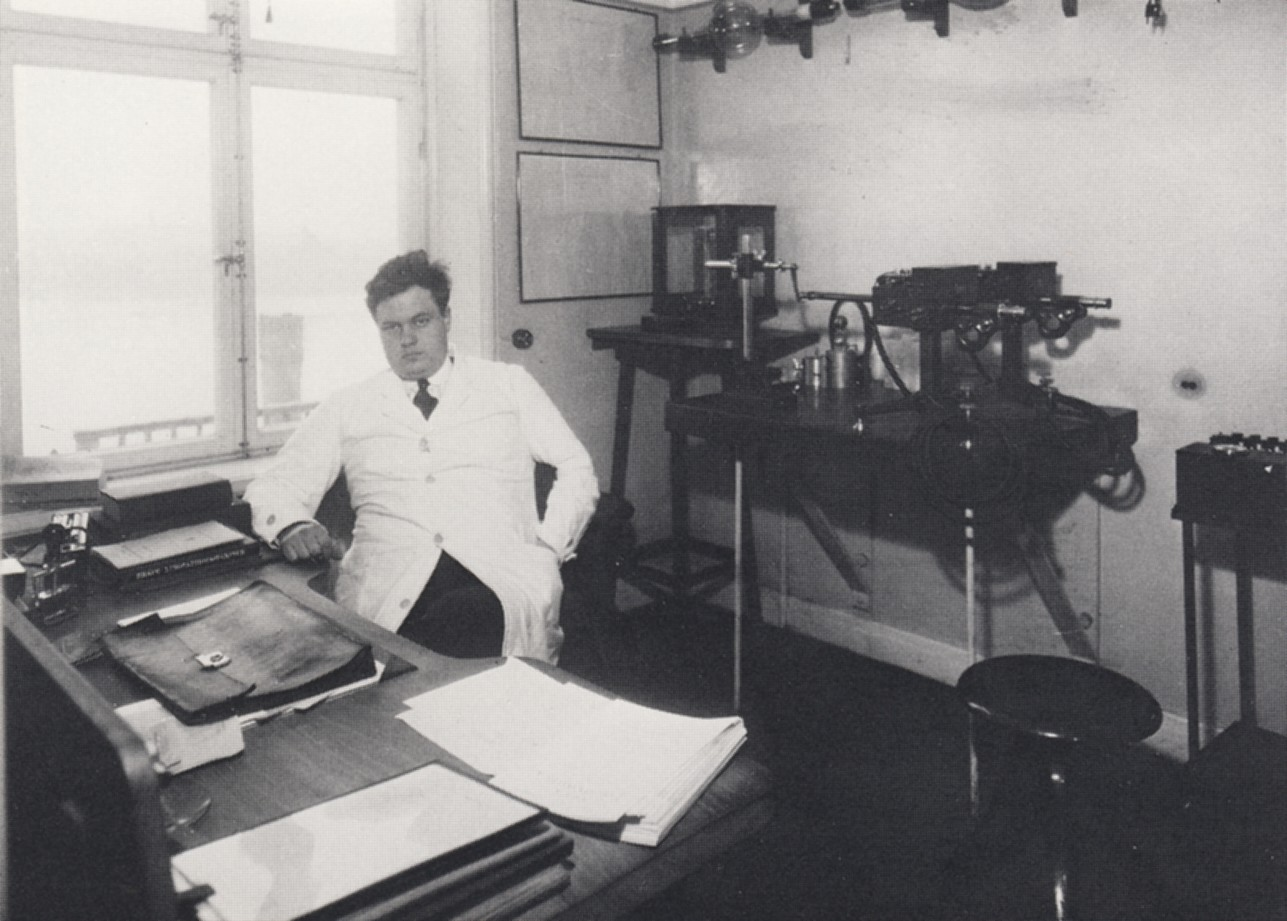
Sievert in 1924

== See also ==
- Sievert integral
- Sievert chamber
- Rolf M. Sievert Award
