= Leuckart reaction =

Chemical reaction

Named after	Rudolf Leuckart
Reaction type	Substitution reaction

Identifiers
RSC ontology ID	RXNO:0000101

The Leuckart reaction is the chemical reaction that converts aldehydes or ketones to amines. The reaction is an example of reductive amination. The reaction, named after Rudolf Leuckart, uses either ammonium formate or formamide as the nitrogen donor and reducing agent. It requires high temperatures, usually between 120 and 130 °C; for the formamide variant, the temperature can be greater than 165 °C.

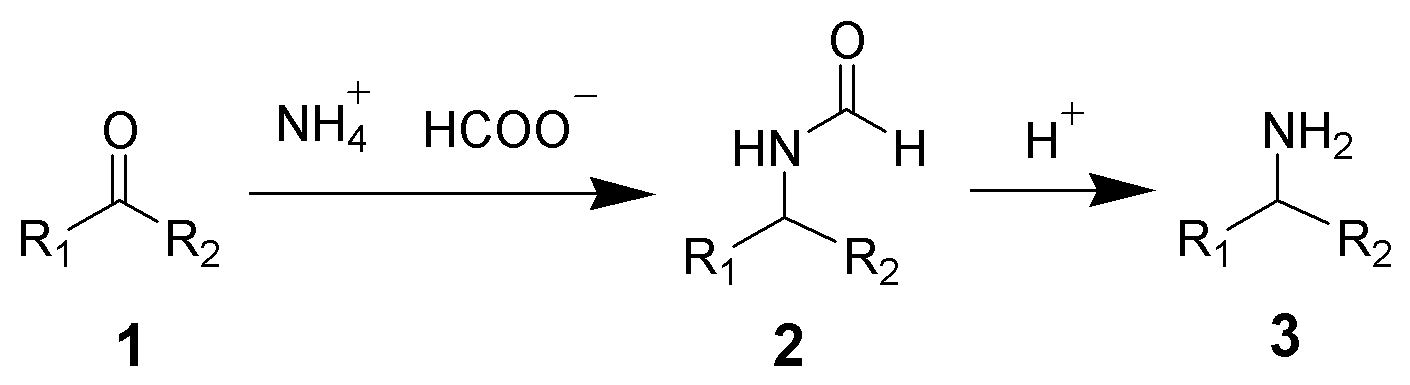
The ketone is converted to an amine via reductive amination using ammonium formate

== History ==
The Leuckart reaction is named in honor of its developer, the German chemist Rudolf Leuckart (1854–1899). He discovered that heating benzaldehyde with formamide does not produce benzylidenediformamide as anticipated, but benzylamine. In 1891, a colleague of Leuckart at the University of Göttingen, Otto Wallach, performed further reactions using alicyclic and terpenoid ketones as well as aldehydes, demonstrating the general application. Over the course of the past century, chemists have discovered several methods to improve the yield of the reaction and carry it out under less strenuous conditions. Pollard and Young summarized various ways in which amines can be formed: using either formamide or ammonium formate, or both, or adding formic acid to formamide. However, using just ammonium formate as the reagent produces the best yields. Using formamide produces low yields compared to ammonium formate but yields can be increased by using large amount of formamide, or using ammonium formate, ammonium sulfate, and magnesium chloride as catalysts.

== Mechanism ==
=== Ammonium formate as reagent ===
Ammonium formate is a source of formic acid and ammonia. Starting with nucleophilic attack on the carbonyl by the ammonia, the carbonyl is converted to the iminium ion:

NH_{4}HCO_{2} ⇌ NH_{3} + HCO_{2}H
NH_{3} + R_{2}C=O + HCO_{2}H → R_{2}C=NH^{+}_{2} + HCO^{−}_{2}

The iminium is then reduced by the formate:

R_{2}C=NH^{+}_{2} + HCO^{−}_{2} → R_{2}CH−NH_{2} + CO_{2}

=== Formamide as reagent ===
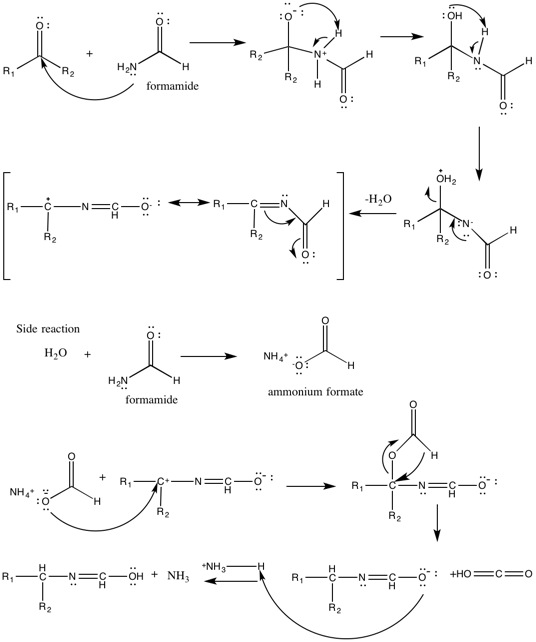
The scheme depicts the mechanism for the Leuckart reaction using formamide as the reducing agent.

Formamide first nucleophilically attacks the carbonyl carbon. The oxygen is protonated by abstracting hydrogen from the nitrogen atom, subsequently forming a water molecule that leaves, forming N-formyl derivative, which is resonance stabilized. Water hydrolyzes formamide to give ammonium formate, which acts as a reducing agent and adds on to the N-formyl derivative. Hydride shift occurs, resulting in loss of carbon dioxide. An ammonium ion is added forming an imine and releasing ammonia. The imine goes through hydrolysis to form the amine, which is depicted in the scheme below.

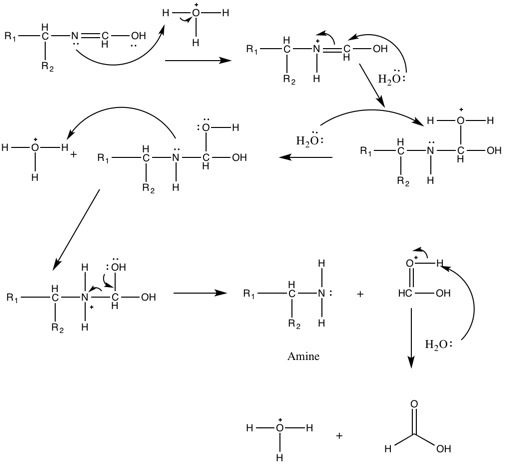
Hydrolysis of imine

== Applications ==
An example of the Leuckart reaction is its use in the synthesis of tetrahydro-1,4 benzodiazepin-5-one, a molecule that is part of the benzodiazepine family.

== See also ==
- Eschweiler–Clarke reaction
