= Sieverts's law =

Physical law of gas solubility in metals

In physical metallurgy and chemistry, Sieverts's law predicts the solubility of gases in metals. It is named after German chemist Adolf Sieverts (1874–1947). The law states that the solubility of a diatomic gas in metal is proportional to the square root of the partial pressure of the gas in thermodynamic equilibrium. Hydrogen, oxygen and nitrogen are examples of dissolved diatomic gases of frequent interest in metallurgy.

== Justification ==
Sieverts's law can be readily rationalized by considering the reaction of dissolution of the gas in the metal, which involves dissociation of the molecule of the gas. For example, for nitrogen:

N_{2} (molecular gas) ⇌ 2 N (dissolved atoms)

For the above reaction, the equilibrium constant is

$$K = \frac{c_\text{at}^2}{p_\text{mol}},$$

where:

c_{at} is the concentration of the dissolved atoms into the metal (in the case above, atomic nitrogen N),
p_{mol} is the partial pressure of the gas at the interface with the metal (in the case above, the molecular nitrogen N_{2}).

Therefore,

$$c_\text{at}  =  \sqrt{K p_\text{mol}}.$$

== See also ==
- Henry's law
- Graham's law
