= Rudolf Leuckart =

German zoologist (1822–1898)

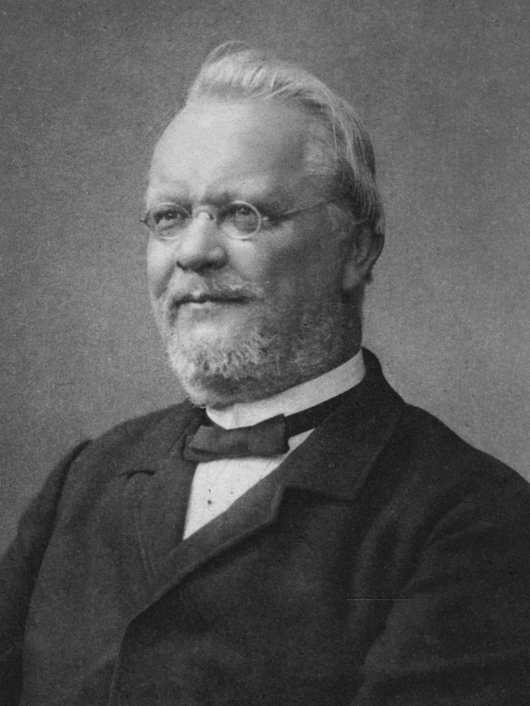
- Rudolf Leuckart
- Born: 7 October 1822; Helmstedt
- Died: 6 February 1898 (aged 75); Leipzig
- Citizenship: Germany
- Education: University of Göttingen
- Known for: Taenia saginata Taenia solium
- Scientific career
- Fields: zoology parasitology
- Workplaces: University of Giessen; University of Leipzig
- Doctoral advisor: Rudolf Wagner
- Notable students: Otto Bütschli; Hugo Münsterberg; Edward Laurens Mark; William Patten; Oskar Krancher

Karl Georg Friedrich Rudolf Leuckart (7 October 1822 – 6 February 1898) was a German zoologist and a professor at the University of Giessen and then at Leipzig. He was a pioneer of parasitology research and established the field through a two-volume work on the parasites of humans. He has been called the "father of parasitology". He published a two-volume work on the parasites of humans. He helped identify the life history of Trichinella and helped manage trichinosis. He was also known for developing a series of illustrated wall charts for use in zoology instruction. He was a nephew to naturalist Friedrich Sigismund Leuckart (1794–1843). His son Rudolf Leuckart became a chemist but died young.

== Life and work ==
Leuckart was born in Helmstedt to the son of book printer and his wife Friederike Dorothea Charlotte (1785–1834) née Theuerkauf. He studied at the local school and became interested in entomology at an early age through the influence of the Helmstedt lepidopterist Hermann von Heinemann. In 1842 he joined the University of Göttingen to study medicine and here he was influenced by the physiologist Rudolf Wagner. In 1845 he graduated and became Wagner's assistant. He worked with Heinrich Frey on rewriting "Anatomy of the Invertebrates" (1845). He also wrote a dissertation in 1845 “De monstris eorumque causis et ortu” that earned him a doctorate. He habilitated in 1847. He participated in an expedition into the North Sea and then began to examine the classification and evolution of marine organisms. He was responsible for splitting Cuvier's phylum Radiata into Coelenterata and Echinodermata. He became an associate professor at the University of Giessen in 1850 and became a full professor in 1855. He married Amalie (1827–1921) daughter of professor Eduard Henke (1783–1829) in 1850. He examined sexual reproduction in insects and discovered the micropyle of the egg. He also examined parthenogenesis in bees. In 1851 he took an interest in the siphonophores and introduced the idea of "polymorphism" (different from the modern sense) where many individual organisms formed a larger body. In Giessen he was involved in studies on Trichinella spiralis. Further work on parasitic worms led to his most famous work - Die menschlichen Parasiten und die von ihnen herrührenden Krankheiten (1863-69) on human parasites and their diseases. In 1869 he moved to the University of Leipzig where he began to work on invertebrate comparative anatomy. Here he began to study the evolution of the eye. He served as a rector in 1877 and he also developed a system of wall charts for teaching biology. With his colleagues Hinrich Nitsche and Carl Chun, they developed 101 charts between 1877 and 1892. In 1898 he suffered from pneumonia which worsened his suffering following the death of his son Rudolf in 1889 and that of a daughter.

In 1877 he became honorary foreign member of the Linnean Society of London.

== Parasitology ==
Leuckart is remembered for his work in parasitology, particularly research regarding tapeworm and trichinosis. He was the first to prove that Taenia saginata occurs only in cattle (and humans), and Taenia solium occurs only in swine (and humans). His study of Trichina helped support Rudolf Virchow's campaign to create meat inspection laws in Germany. With Virchow and Friedrich Albert von Zenker (1825–1898), he was the first to document the life cycle of the parasite Trichinella spiralis in swine and humans.

He, and independently Algernon Thomas, experimentally discovered the life-cycle of the sheep liver fluke in 1881–1883.

Today the "Rudolf-Leuckart-Medaille" is an annual award given for research in parasitology by the Deutschen Gesellschaft für Parasitologie (German Society of Parasitology).

== Other contributions ==
Leuckart is credited with splitting George Cuvier's Radiata into two phyla: Coelenterata and Echinodermata. In the field of entomology, he conducted investigations into the micropyle and fertilization of insect eggs, the reproduction and development involving members of Pupipara, parthenogenesis among insects, and studies on the anatomy and life history of the honeybee.

A quote attributed to Rudolf Leuckart:

It is not possible for man, as a thinking being, to close his mind to the knowledge that he is ruled by the same power as is the animal world. Like the despised worm he lives in dependence upon external commands, and like the worm he perishes, even when he has shaken the world through the power of his ideas

— Rudolf Leuckart

== Legacy ==
A species of Australian lizard, Anomalopus leuckartii, is named in his honor.

== Written works ==
- Beiträge zur Kenntnis wirbelloser Tiere, (Contributions to the knowledge of invertebrate animals) with Heinrich Frey; Braunschweig, 1847.
- Über die Morphologie und Verwandtschaftsverhältnisse der wirbellosen Tiere, (On the morphology and relationships of invertebrate animals) Braunschweig, 1848
- Zur Morphologie und Anatomie der Geschlechtsorgane, (Morphology and anatomy of reproductive organs) Braunschweig, 1848.
- Beiträge zur Lehre der Befruchtung, (Contributions to the theory of fertilization) Göttinger Nachrichten, 1849.
- Über den Polymorphismus der Individuen oder die Erscheinungen der Arbeitsteilung in der Natur, (On polymorphism of individuals or the phenomena of division of labor in nature), Gießen, 1851.
- Zoologische Untersuchungen, (Zoological research) Gießen, 1853–54, 3 Hefte.
- Vergleichende Anatomie und Physiologie, (Comparative Anatomy and Physiology) Leuckart & Bergmann, Stuttgart, 1852.
- Die Fortpflanzung und Entwicklung der Pupiparen, (The reproduction and development of Pupipara) Halle, 1857.
- Zur Kenntnis des Generationswechsels und der Parthenogenesis bei den Insekten, (Change in generations and parthenogenesis in insects) Frankfurt, 1858.
- Untersuchungen über Trichina spiralis, (Studies on Trichina spiralis) Leipzig, 1860, second edition- 1866.
- Die Blasenwürmer und ihre Entwicklung, (Bladder-worms and their development) Gießen, 1856.
- Die Parasiten des Menschen und die von ihnen herrührenden Krankheiten, (Parasites of man and the diseases arising from them), Leipzig, 1863–76, 2 volumes; second edition- 1879 ff.
- Die Entwicklunggeschichte des Leberegels (Distonum hepaticum, dt.), (Developmental history of the liver fluke (Distonum hepatic dt.) in: Zoologischer Anzeiger 4, 1881.
- Neue Beiträge zur Kenntnis des Baes und der Lebensgeschichte der Nematoden, (New contributions to the knowledge of Baes and the life history of nematodes, 1887.
