= Sievert integral =

The Sievert integral, named after Swedish medical physicist Rolf Sievert, is a special function commonly encountered in radiation transport calculations.

It plays a role in the sievert (symbol: Sv) unit of ionizing radiation dose in the International System of Units (SI).

== Definition ==
$$F(x,\theta)=\int_0^\theta {e^{-x\sec(\varphi)}}\,d{\varphi}.$$
