= Rudolf Leuckart (chemist) =

German chemist (1854–1889)

- Born: 23 June 1854; Gießen, German Confederation
- Died: 24 July 1889 (aged 35); Leipzig, German Empire
- Education: University of Heidelberg, University of Leipzig
- Known for: Leuckart reaction
- Scientific career
- Workplaces: University of Göttingen

Carl Louis Rudolf Alexander Leuckart (23 June 1854 – 24 July 1889) was a German chemist who discovered the Leuckart reaction and Leuckart thiophenol reaction.

He was the son of Karl Georg Friedrich Rudolf Leuckart (1822–1898) a renowned German zoologist. He received his PhD at the University of Leipzig in 1879 and his habilitation at University of Göttingen in 1883, where he also became professor.
