= Particulate matter =

Microscopic solid or liquid matter suspended in the Earth's atmosphere

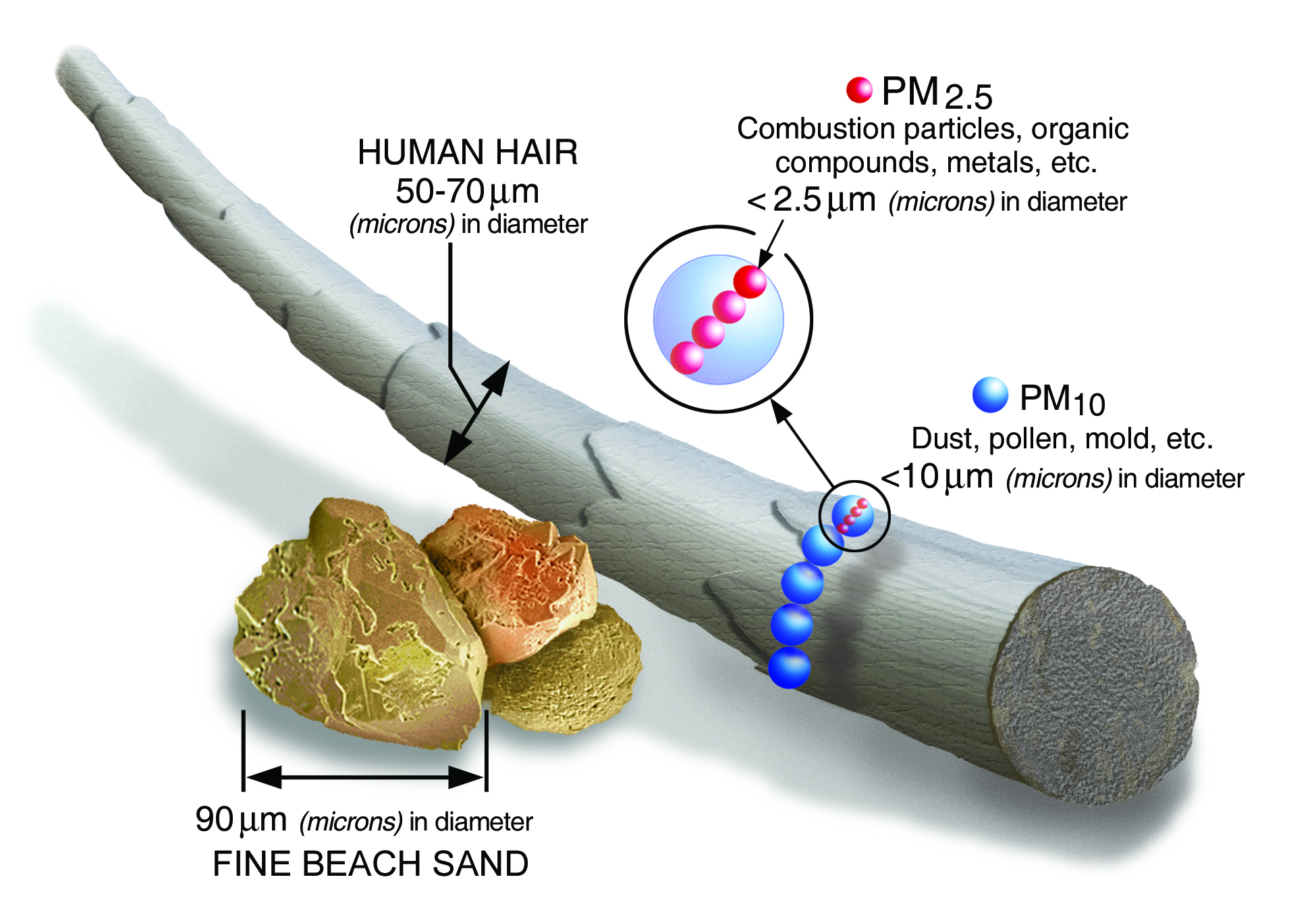
PM_{2.5} and PM_{10} compared with a human hair in a graphic from the Environmental Protection Agency

Particulate matter (PM) or particulates (Note: Also known as atmospheric particulate matter, atmospheric aerosol particles) are microscopic particles of solid or liquid matter suspended in the air. The combination of particulates and air is called an aerosol. Sources of particulate matter can be either natural or occur as a result of human activities. Particulates may adversely affect human health and impact climate and precipitation.

Categories of atmospheric particles include inhalable coarse particles, designated PM_{10}, which are particles of coarse granularity, with a particle diameter of 10 micrometers (μm) or less; fine particles, designated PM_{2.5}, with a diameter of 2.5 μm or less; ultrafine particles, PM_{.10} with a diameter of 100 nanometers (nm) or less; and soot (fine or ultrafine particles primarily made up of carbon).

Airborne particulate matter is a IARC Group 1 carcinogen. Particulate matter is considered the most dangerous type of air pollution because particulates can penetrate deep into the lungs and travel through the blood stream to multiple organs, such as the brain. Particulate matter contributes to health problems such as stroke, cardiovascular disease, respiratory disease, many types of cancer, and preterm birth. It is associated with an increased risk of cognitive impairment. There is no safe level for exposure to particulates.

Worldwide, exposure to PM_{2.5} contributed to 7.9 million deaths in 2023; of those, 4.9 million had outdoor air pollution as a contributing factor, and 2.8 million had household air pollution as a contributing factor. Fine particulate matter (PM_{2.5}) is considered the leading environmental risk factor for earlier death worldwide. Because many sources of particulates result from human actions, it is a modifiable risk factor which can be addressed. Many countries have established standards for particulate matter and are improving air quality.

== Sources ==
Types, and size distribution in micrometres (μm), of atmospheric particulate matter

Approximately 90 percent of the total mass of particulate matter in the atmosphere (as estimated in 2010) comes from natural sources such as volcanoes, dust storms, forest and grassland fires, living vegetation and sea spray, emitting particulates such as volcanic ash, desert dust, soot and sea salt. Human-contributed (anthropogenic) particulate matter accounts for the remaining 10 percent of the total mass of aerosols.

Human activities that generate particulates include:

- Burning of fossil fuels (coal, oil, and natural gas) for electricity, heat and transportation, biomass fuels (plants, wood, crop residue and manure) for heating and cooking, waste, joss paper, and firecrackers.
- Construction and renovation (including earthwork and foundation, demolition and rehabilitation).
- Dusty materials that are not properly stored, cleaned up or disposed of (from construction sites, landfills, industrial facilities, and households).
- Waste incineration.
- Concrete.
- Metalworking (grinding, cutting, welding).
- Woodworking (sawing, sanding, and planing).
- Industrial processes such as quarrying, mining, smelting and oil refining.
- Wet cooling towers in cooling systems.
- Exhaust gas from motor vehicles, including diesel exhaust from heavy equipment used in construction, road building, and other industries.
- Road dust from unpaved roads and from the wearing down of tires, brakes, and paved road surfaces.
- Microplastics (as a type of airborne PM) of which vehicle-related microplastics from road and tire wear are a major part.
- Agricultural activities (e.g. wind erosion, ploughing, soil tilling, grain harvesting, and livestock management).
- Cooking (frying, boiling, grilling).
- Smoking
- Disasters (e.g. wildfires, which may be human- or naturally-caused, wars, and the 11 September attacks.)

=== Worldwide and seasonal sources ===
Human-generated particulates are often smaller in size (e.g. PM_{2.5} or PM_{1}), and pose significant threats to human health.Globally, major contributors to PM_{2.5} include residential energy use (40%), industrial processes (11.7%), and energy generation (10.2%), all of which involve fuel combustion.

The types of emissions that contribute to particulate matter vary widely across countries and local regions, reflecting regional characteristics, seasonal variation, human activities, and types of fuels used. A worldwide analysis in 2021 reported that of anthropogenic fuels, coal was the highest contributor to PM_{2.5}-related mortality in China; oil and natural gas dominated in Egypt, Russia, and the United States; and solid biofuels had the highest impact in Pakistan, Bangladesh, Indonesia, India, and Nigeria.

Contributions due to residential fuel use varied from 4.0% in Egypt to 33.1% in Indonesia. Contributions from energy and industry sectors ranged from 3.2% in Nigeria to 27.3% in India. The most common PM_{2.5}-related causes of death were ischemic heart disease (IHD) and stroke. The impact of windblown dust ranged from 1.5% in Bangladesh to 70.6% in Nigeria, where lower respiratory tract infections (LRIs) in childhood were the largest PM_{2.5}-related cause of mortality.

An examination of PM_{2.5} concentrations using data from 2000 to 2019 showed that during those two decades, PM_{2.5} concentrations in Europe and northern America decreased, due to reductions in fossil fuel emissions. However, exposures increased in southern Asia, Australia, New Zealand, Latin America and the Caribbean. Distinct seasonal patterns were seen in many parts of the world. There were regular high regional PM_{2.5} concentrations in the Amazon rainforest in August and September. Sub-Saharan Africa showed higher levels from June to September. Levels in eastern North America were higher in their summer months. Levels in China and north India were high in their winter months, as were levels in South Korea.

=== Domestic combustion ===
As of 2023, more than 2.3 billion people worldwide, many of them in developing countries, burn polluting biomass fuels such as wood, dry dung, coal, or kerosene for cooking or heating. This causes harmful household air pollution and contributes significantly to outdoor air pollution. Cooking-related pollution was estimated to cause 3.7 million annual deaths.

Burning biomass emits large amounts of pollutants including PM_{2.5} and PM_{10}, black and brown carbon, carbon monoxide, nitrogen oxides (NOx), sulfur dioxide and ozone. The chemical composition of the emitted PM is different for different types of biomass fuels. Less energy dense fuels, such as dung, generate more PM_{2.5}. Dung and wood yield higher organic aerosol emissions, while dung emits more nitrogen content than other biomass fuels.

In the United Kingdom domestic combustion is the largest single source of PM_{2.5} and PM_{10} annually. In 2019, domestic wood burning in both closed stoves and open fires was responsible for 38% of PM_{2.5} in the UK. Following the introduction of new laws in 2021 that restricted the sale of wet wood and house coal, particulate levels from domestic use decreased. During 2024, domestic wood burning was responsible for 20% of PM_{2.5} and 11% of PM_{10} in the UK. During the winter months, the impact of wood burning is higher and can contribute to half of PM_{2.5} concentrations.

Given the health effects of wood smoke, it is recommended that people only use wood burners or fireplaces if they had no other source of heat. If a stove or open fire is used, the release of particulates may be reduced by using an improved closed wood-burning stove of appropriate size for the space to be heated, maintaining the stove properly, using seasoned wood or kiln-dried wood, and managing the fire appropriately. When cooking, use of improved cooking stoves and better quality fuels may help to reduce particulate exposure.

=== Waste combustion ===
Composition of particles can vary greatly depending on their sources and production. Particles emitted from fuel combustion are not the same as those emitted from waste combustion. Particulates emitted from the burning of vegetation, incense paper, construction waste, and plastics will all differ. Particulate matter from a fire in a recycling yard or a ship full of scrap metal may contain more toxic substances than other types of burning.

=== Construction ===
Different types of building activities produce different kinds of dust, that can have different effects on health. The composition of PM generated from cutting or mixing concrete made with Portland Cement would be different from those generated from cutting or mixing concrete made with different types of slag (e.g. GGBFS, EAF slag), fly ash or even EAF dust (EAFD), while EFAD, slag and fly ash are likely to be more toxic as they contain heavy metals. Besides slag cement that is sold and used as an environmental friendly product, fake (adulterated) cement, where different types of slag, fly ash or other unknown substances are added, is also common in some places due to the much lower production cost. To address quality and toxicity problems, some places are starting to ban the use of EAF slag in cement used in buildings.

Composition of welding fumes varies and it depends on the metals in the material being welded and the composition of the coatings, electrode, etc. being used.

Since construction and refurbishment projects are prominent sources of particulate matter, planning and mitigation measures regarding PM emission should be adopted and carefully monitored, particularly when such projects involve actively used health facilities.

== Composition ==
GEOS portrait of global aerosols, August 1-September 14, 2024. Black carbon/Fires (orange/red) Mineral dust (pink/magenta) Sea salt (blue) Sulfates (green)

The chemical composition of particulate matter (PM) in atmospheric aerosols varies widely with both time and space. It is affected by emission sources (both natural- and human-caused), geography, weather conditions, and chemical reactions. Atmospheric aerosols can change between liquid, solid, and semisolid states depending on conditions. The particulate matter in an aerosol can be described as primary (directly emitted) or secondary (formed through chemical reactions in the air). PM can include both organic and inorganic components such as minerals.

Both chemical composition and particle size and shape have effects on human health. Inhalable particles are often classified in terms of size as either coarse (PM_{10}) with a diameter of 10 micrometers (μm) or less, or fine (PM_{2.5}) with a diameter of 2.5 μm or less. Smaller particulates can penetrate deeper into the lungs and travel through the blood stream to reach other organs. Human-generated particulates are often smaller in size (e.g. PM_{2.5} or PM_{1}), and pose significant threats to human health.

The chemical composition and size of particulates in an aerosol also determine how the aerosol interacts with solar radiation and affects climate. Chemical constituents within an aerosol change its overall refractive index, determining how much light is scattered or absorbed.

=== Mineral dust ===
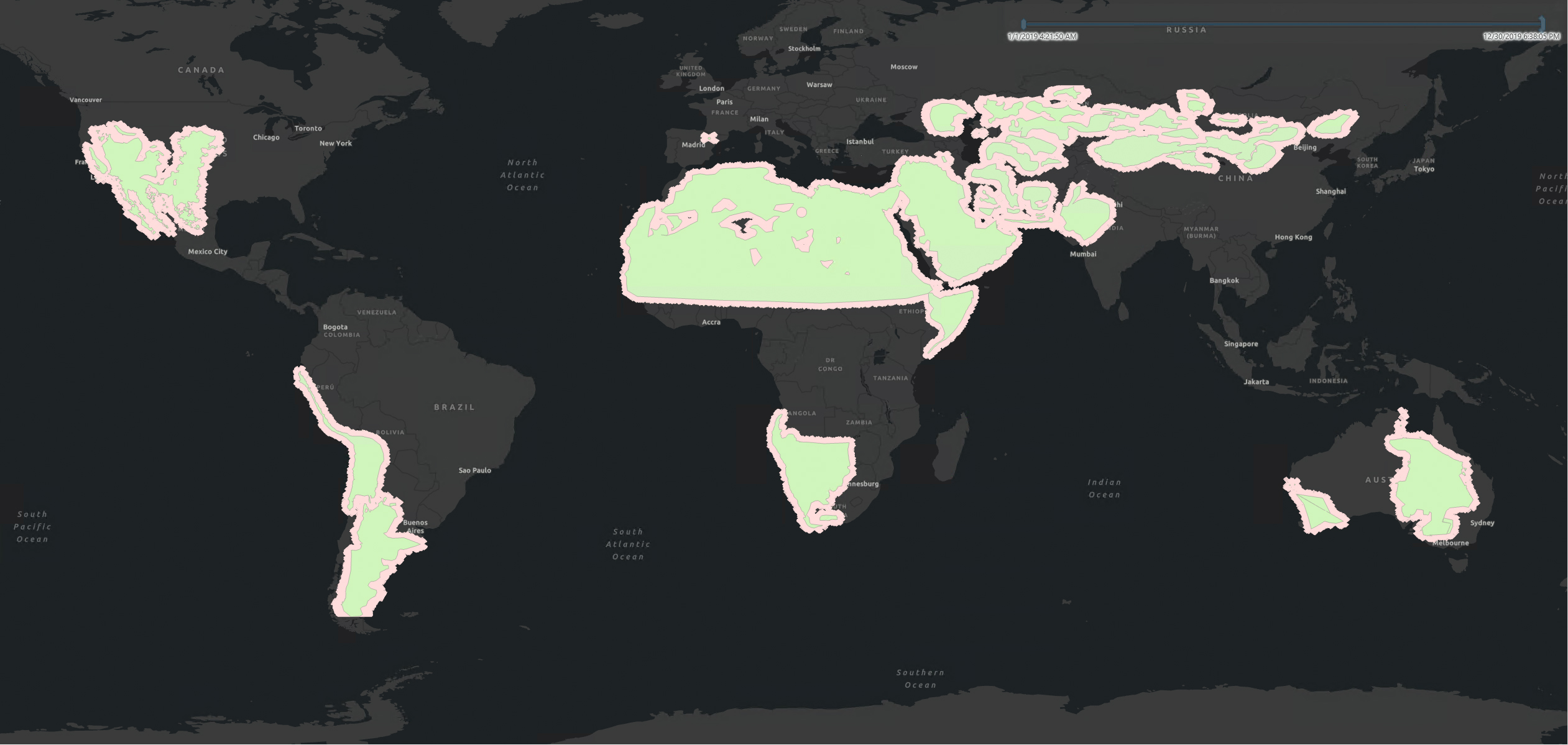
NASA's Earth Surface Mineral Dust Source Investigation (EMIT) map of global mineral dust sources, 2022

Wind-blown mineral dust is a major component of particulate matter globally. Most sand and dust storms originate from a dust belt stretching from north Africa through the Middle East into Asia. Dust storms can also arise in arid areas of North and South America and Australia. Particles from dust storms can remain in the atmosphere and travel thousands of km from their source.

Mineral dust is a complex mixture that can be formed from quartz, feldspars, clays, calcites, iron oxides and other material blown from the Earth's crust. It often contains mineral oxides of major crustal elements such as aluminum (Al), silicon (Si), calcium (Ca), iron (Fe), and titanium (Ti). It can also contain alkali metals such as potassium (K), sodium (Na), and lithium (Li); alkaline earth metals such as magnesium (Mg); and heavy metals such as lead (Pb), copper (Cu), nickel (Ni), and zinc (Zn). Mineral dust in particulate matter is light-absorbing. Higher levels of lead in top soil and dust are associated with higher blood levels of lead in people.

=== Sea salt ===
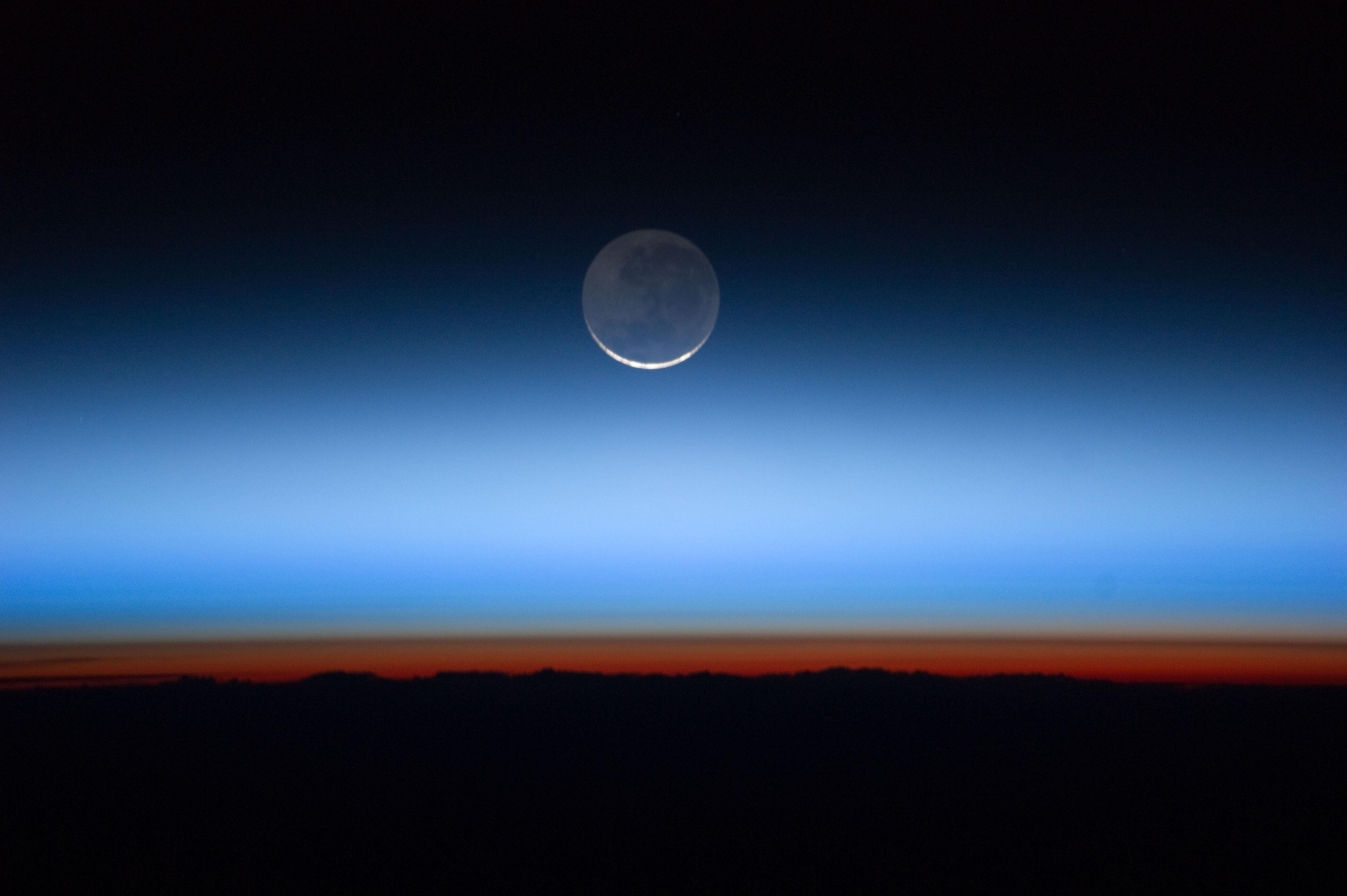
Horizon and layers of the atmosphere as seen from NASA Earth Observatory: troposphere (darkest), tropopause (brown), stratosphere (gray), mesosphere, thermosphere, and exosphere (blues). Colors are due to the dominant gases and particles in each layer.

Sea salt particles are another leading contributor to global particulate matter. Sea salt aerosols (SSAs) can develop over both open water and pack ice. Approximately 80% of the surface of the Southern Hemisphere is oceanic, and the average concentration of SSAs is generally higher there than in the Northern Hemisphere. The production of sea salt aerosols is affected by aspects of the air-sea interface including wind speed, seawater temperature, surface tension, density, and viscosity. Their distribution also varies with altitude, falling off rapidly at higher levels. Few sea-salt particles rise above the tropopause to reach the upper troposphere.

Sea salt aerosols reflect the composition of sea spray and evaporated sea water, consisting mainly of inorganic salts like sodium chloride (NaCl), along with magnesium, sulfate, calcium, bromine and potassium. Sea salt aerosols can include biological and organic matter such as bacteria, viruses, proteins, enzymes, dissolved organic carbon, fatty acids and sugars. SSA particles are key to the formation of clouds: hygroscopicity, the ability of an individual particle to take up water and eventually become a cloud droplet, is a function of particle size and composition. Sea salt aerosols affect climate both directly by scattering incoming solar radiation and indirectly through cloud formation. They are relatively large compared to other aerosols.

=== Organic matter ===
Organic matter (OM) contains carbon-based compounds, which can be either primary or secondary. Carbon combines with hydrogen and other elements to form complex molecules like carbohydrates, proteins, and DNA in living organisms. Burning of living or once-living matter, whether natural or human-caused, releases black carbon (BC) and organic carbon (OC), both of which are part of smoke and soot. Approximately 85% of the world's population lives in the Northern Hemisphere, where human activities are the dominant sources of organic matter and fine particulate matter (PM_{25}).

Black carbon tends to be released at higher temperatures and contains mostly pure (elemental) carbon. Organic carbon contains additional materials and is more complex. Bioaerosols are a form of organic carbon, biological fragments of living microbial, fungal, animal, and plant sources. Microplastics are synthetic polymer chains that are carbon-based. Organic matter can influence the atmospheric radiation field by both scattering and absorption. Black carbon is the most strongly light-absorbing aerosol component, while organic carbon tends to be less absorptive, depending on its structure. In addition to carbon compounds, the burning of petroleum and oil also releases sulfur oxides and many other chemicals into the atmosphere.

=== Secondary inorganic aerosols ===
Secondary inorganic aerosols (SIA) are major components of PM_{2.5}, small inhalable particulate matter that is linked to health problems. Secondary inorganic aerosols form when gaseous vapors in the atmosphere (e.g. SO_{2}, NO and NO_{2}, NH_{3}, VOCs) react chemically to produce compounds that then form particles. Precursor gases may be anthropogenic (e.g. from biomass and fossil fuel combustion) or natural (e.g. from dust, forest fires, or sea salt aerosols) in origin. Aerosols can mix rapidly in ambient air, forming new chemical compounds as well as diluting their concentration with distance from an emissions source.

The smallest class of particulates, PM_{1} frequently contains sulfate, ammonium, and nitrate. Primary gases such as sulfur and nitrogen oxides can oxidize to form secondary particles of sulfuric acid (liquid) and nitric acid (gaseous). In the presence of ammonia, they often form ammonium salts such as ammonium sulfate and ammonium nitrate (both can be dry or in aqueous solution). Secondary sulfate and nitrate aerosols tend to reflect solar radiation, but their ability to scatter light is affected by water absorption.

=== Composition of wildfires and haze ===
Due to effects of climate change, wildfire seasons have become increasingly severe globally, producing large amounts of particulate matter that can spread over thousands of miles. Wildfire smoke contains high levels of PM_{2.5}, carbon monoxide, carbon dioxide, heavy metals like lead, and PAHs, which combine to form secondary pollutants. Wildfire smoke particulate matter is more toxic than similar weights of PM from non-fire-related ambient air.

Haze, particulate matter that generally causes visual effects, tends to consist of sulfur dioxide, nitrogen oxides, carbon monoxide, mineral dust, and organic matter in dry air. The particles are hygroscopic due to the presence of sulfur, and SO_{2} is converted to sulfate when high humidity and low temperatures are present. This causes reduced visibility and red-orange-yellow colors.

== Measurement ==
Particulates have been measured in increasingly sophisticated ways since air pollution was first systematically studied in the early 20th century. The earliest methods included relatively crude Ringelmann charts, which were grey-shaded cards against which emissions from smokestacks could be visually compared, and deposit gauges, which collected the soot deposited in a particular location so it could be weighed.

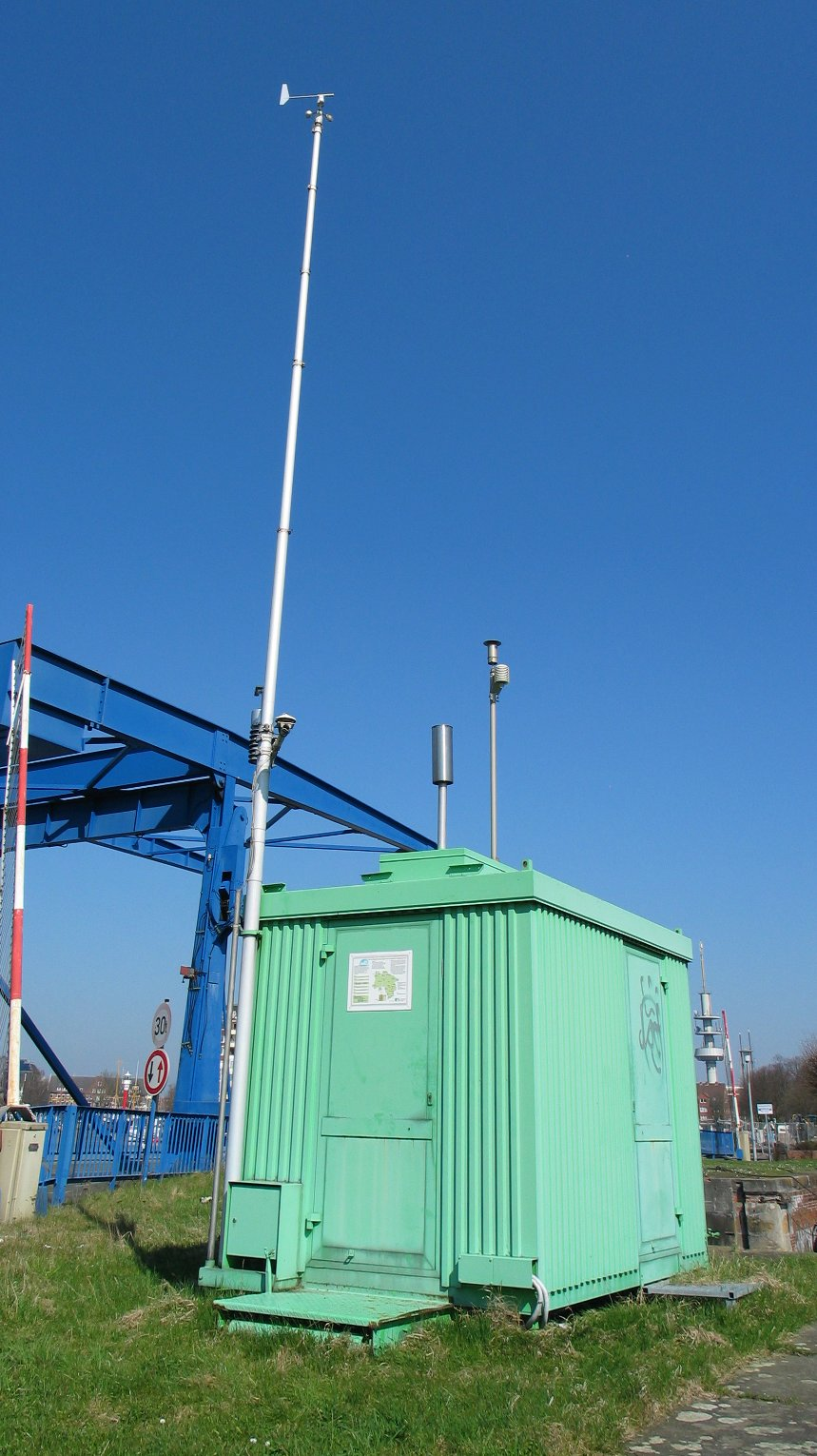
Air pollution measurement station in Emden, Germany

Modern air pollution measurement techniques characterize ambient air quality using data from three main sources: direct measurements of on site sources, computer models, and remote sensing platforms such as satellites. Direct methods of measuring particulates can determine the total mass of particles per unit volume of air (particle mass concentration) using techniques such as gravimetric air quality analysis, beta attenuation monitoring, tapered element oscillating microbalances, and aethalometers (for black carbon). Sometimes it is more useful to measure the total number of particles per unit volume of air (particle number concentration). This can be done with optical particle counters and condensation particle counters.

To measure the atomic composition of particulate samples, techniques such as X-ray spectrometry can be used. Special filters and detection techniques can be used to select samples of a particular size (e.g. PM_{10} or PM_{2.5}) or chemical composition (e.g. black carbon) and to track their distribution over time. Human-generated particulates are often smaller in size (e.g. PM_{2.5} or PM_{1}) than naturally formed ones.

False-color map based on data from the Moderate Resolution Imaging Spectroradiometer (MODIS) on NASA's Terra satellite. The percentage of small particles is displayed by color, from green (few small particles) to red (many small particles). Gray: the sensor did not collect data.

Satellite-based estimates of PM_{2.5} are important tools. Satellite measurements of aerosols are based on the fact that particles change the way the atmosphere reflects and absorbs visible and infrared light. Satellites measure aerosol optical depth (AOD) and other factors that indicate the concentration and distribution of particulates in the atmosphere. PM_{2.5} concentrations are then inferred from the satellite data by using models or ground-based monitoring data. Combining these approaches can enhance the spatial coverage of PM_{2.5}, to show patterns of distribution and movement in space and time. Such information can be used to create smoke forecasts and pollution advisories.

== Movement and deposition ==
Satellite data has shown that volcanic eruptions can send ash and particles high into the atmosphere, with fine particulates remaining in the air for long periods, traveling over long distances, and affecting global climate. Particulate matter from wildfires in the western United States and Canada can travel to the United Kingdom and northern France in a few days. Dust thrown into the air by sandstorms in the Sahara travels from North Africa to North America.

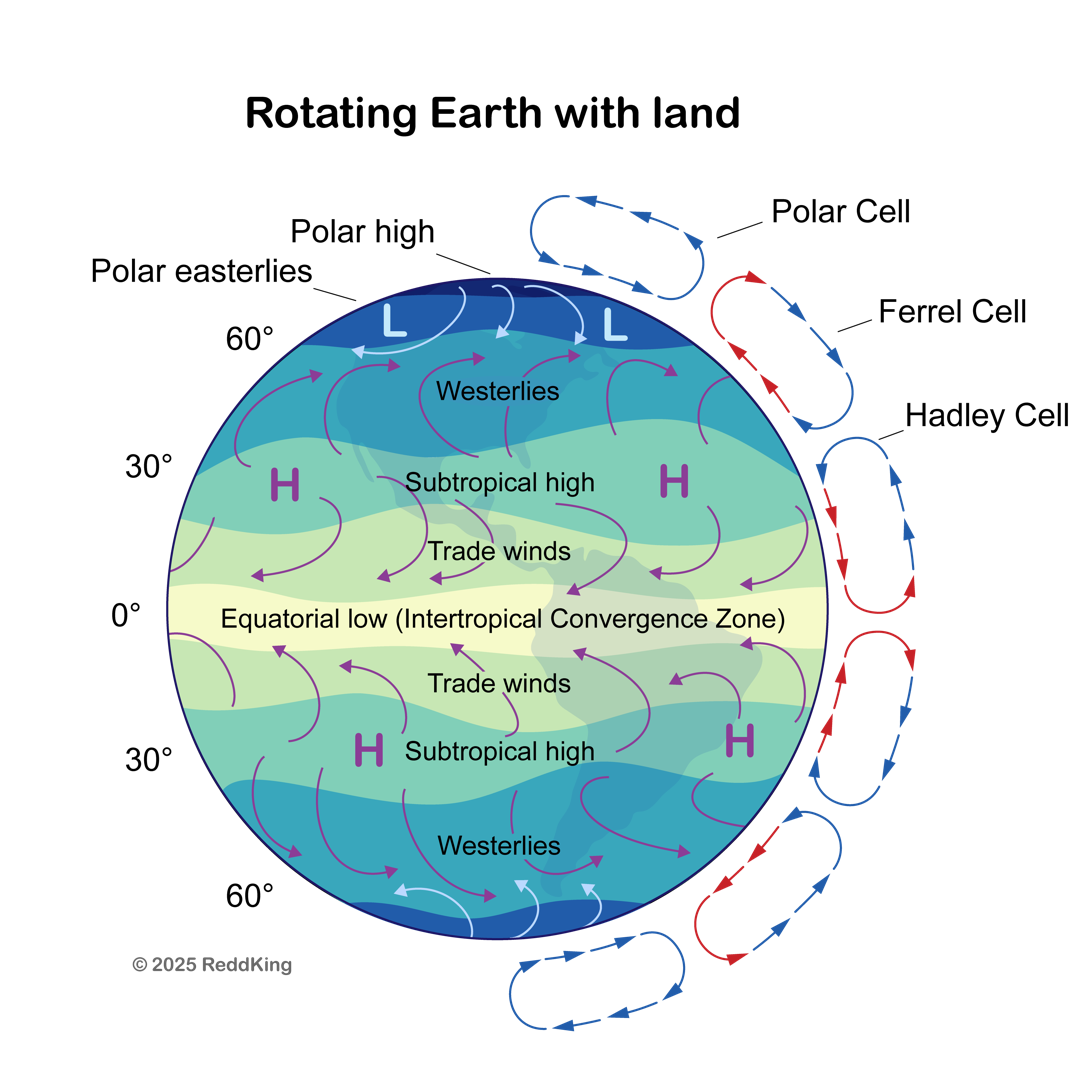
Global atmospheric circulation: Earth's rotation creates characteristic wind belts

Particles are transported globally and locally via characteristic atmospheric and oceanic currents, transitioning between air and water at the air-sea interface. Particles move between land, water and air through mechanisms such as emission, suspension, and deposition. Circulation models take into account the release of particulates into the air, conditions under which they remain in air, their physical transport, and their removal from the atmosphere.

Wet deposition or precipitation scavenging is the removal of particulate matter from the atmosphere through interactions with clouds, precipitation, and other particles that lead to settling. Particles may act as cloud condensation nuclei to create cloud droplets or collide with already-formed raindrops.

Dry deposition involves the transfer of particles from the atmosphere onto surfaces (soil, water, living things, buildings) independent of precipitation. Dry deposition of particles is affected by gravity, wind speed, turbulence and the presence of surfaces (which can include other particles).

Sedimentation (settling due to gravity) and evaporation are influenced by physical and chemical factors including temperature, humidity, particle radius, particle volume, and height at which an emission is released. In general, the smaller and lighter a particle is, the longer it will stay suspended in air. Larger particles (greater than 50–100 μm in diameter) tend to settle to the ground quickly as a result of gravity, and may travel no more than a few meters from their source. The smallest particles (less than 1 micrometer) can stay in the atmosphere for weeks, and are mostly likely to be removed by precipitation. They may also become resuspended and continue to circulate due to turbulence or collisions with other particulates.

Solubility and evaporation significantly affect the size, phase, and behavior of particles and aerosols. Aerosol particles grow by absorbing water at high relative humidity. Evaporation of water from particulates can lead to phase changes between solid, liquid, or gas, and the formation of crusts and solid particles. Changes of phase, internal structure, and diameter can affect both physical and chemical behaviors of particulate matter.

== Health effects ==
=== Size, shape, and solubility matter ===
Health effects of particulate matter are influenced by factors such as particle size, shape, solubility, charge, chemical composition, and concentration and rate of exposure. Toxicity of particles tends to increase with smaller size, larger surface area, accumulation of material on particle surfaces, and other physical characteristics of particles.

==== Size ====
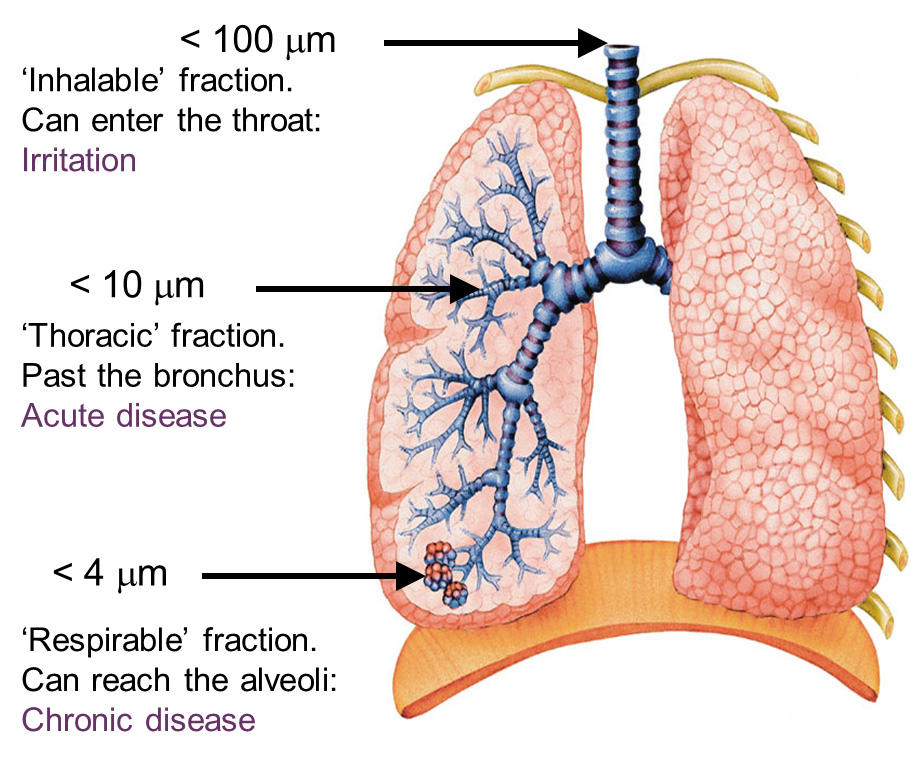
Penetration of airborne particulate matter into the lungs depends on size

The size of particulate matter (PM) is a key determinant of its potential to cause health problems. Particles that enter the respiratory system may either be exhaled and leave the lungs, or be deposited and remain in the lungs. Particles of different sizes deposit in different regions of the respiratory tract, leading to various health effects. Particles that can only reach as far as the upper respiratory tract are called inhalable, while particles that can enter the lungs are called respirable. Particles are grouped by size.

- Coarse particles (PM_{10}), with diameters between 2.5 and 10 micrometers, can be inhaled and can deposit in the upper airways, including the nose, throat, and bronchi. Exposure to PM_{10} is associated with respiratory diseases (e.g. asthma, bronchitis, and rhinosinusitis), and cardiovascular effects (e.g. heart attacks and arrhythmias due to systemic inflammation and oxidative stress).
- Fine particles (PM_{2.5}), with diameters less than 2.5 micrometers, can penetrate deep into the lungs, reaching the bronchioles and alveoli. They are associated with chronic rhinosinusitis, respiratory diseases (e.g. asthma and COPD), and cardiovascular diseases.
- Ultrafine particles (PM_{0.1}), with diameters less than 0.1 micrometers (100 nanometers), can enter the bloodstream and reach other organs, including the heart and brain. Ultrafine particles contribute to health problems including neurodegenerative diseases (e.g. Alzheimer's) and cardiovascular diseases (e.g. atherosclerosis and increased risk of heart attacks).

Particle Size	Deposition Region
>10 μm	Nose/throat
2.5–10 μm	Bronchi
<2.5 μm	bronchioles/Alveoli
<0.1 μm	Blood stream

===== Threshold Concentrations and Guidelines =====
The World Health Organization (WHO) provides guidelines to limit exposure.

- PM_{10}: Annual mean not to exceed 15 μg/m^{3}; 24-hour mean not to exceed 45 μg/m^{3}.
- PM_{2.5}: Annual mean not to exceed 5 μg/m^{3}; 24-hour mean not to exceed 15 μg/m^{3}.
- Exposure above these levels increases the risk of adverse health effects.

An examination of PM_{2.5} concentrations using data from 2000 to 2019 showed that almost all land areas and populations globally are exposed to PM_{2.5} at levels above the WHO's 2021 recommended guidelines.

==== Shape ====
When particulate matter is described in terms of its diameter, as PM_{10} or PM_{2.5}, particles are assumed to have a idealized spherical shape. The actual shape of particles from different sources (e.g. ashes, soot, paint, glass, plastic and fibres) can vary widely. The table below lists the colors and shapes of some common atmospheric particulates:

Type of particulate	Color	Shape
Portland cement	Gray	Irregular
Smolder smoke	White	Spherical
Soot	Black	Fractal aggregate
Water droplets	White	Spherical
Loess	Yellow Brown	Irregular
Lokon volcanic ash	Dark Brown	Irregular
Sahara sand (Libya)	Brown	Irregular

Irregularly shaped particles are more likely to be deposited in airways than spherical ones of similar size. Some particles are brittle and can break into smaller pieces. Those with sharp edges or longer needle-like shapes (e.g. asbestos fibres) are more likely to abrade tissues and lodge in the lungs. Geometrically angular shapes have more surface area than rounder shapes, increasing the area available for binding to other substances, which can increase toxicity. Chemical composition can affect interactions with lung tissue and respiratory fluids and influence whether a particle will stick to a surface. All of these factors can affect the ways in which particles are inhaled, deposited, cleared, and interact within the respiratory system.

Scanning electronic microscopy of particulates
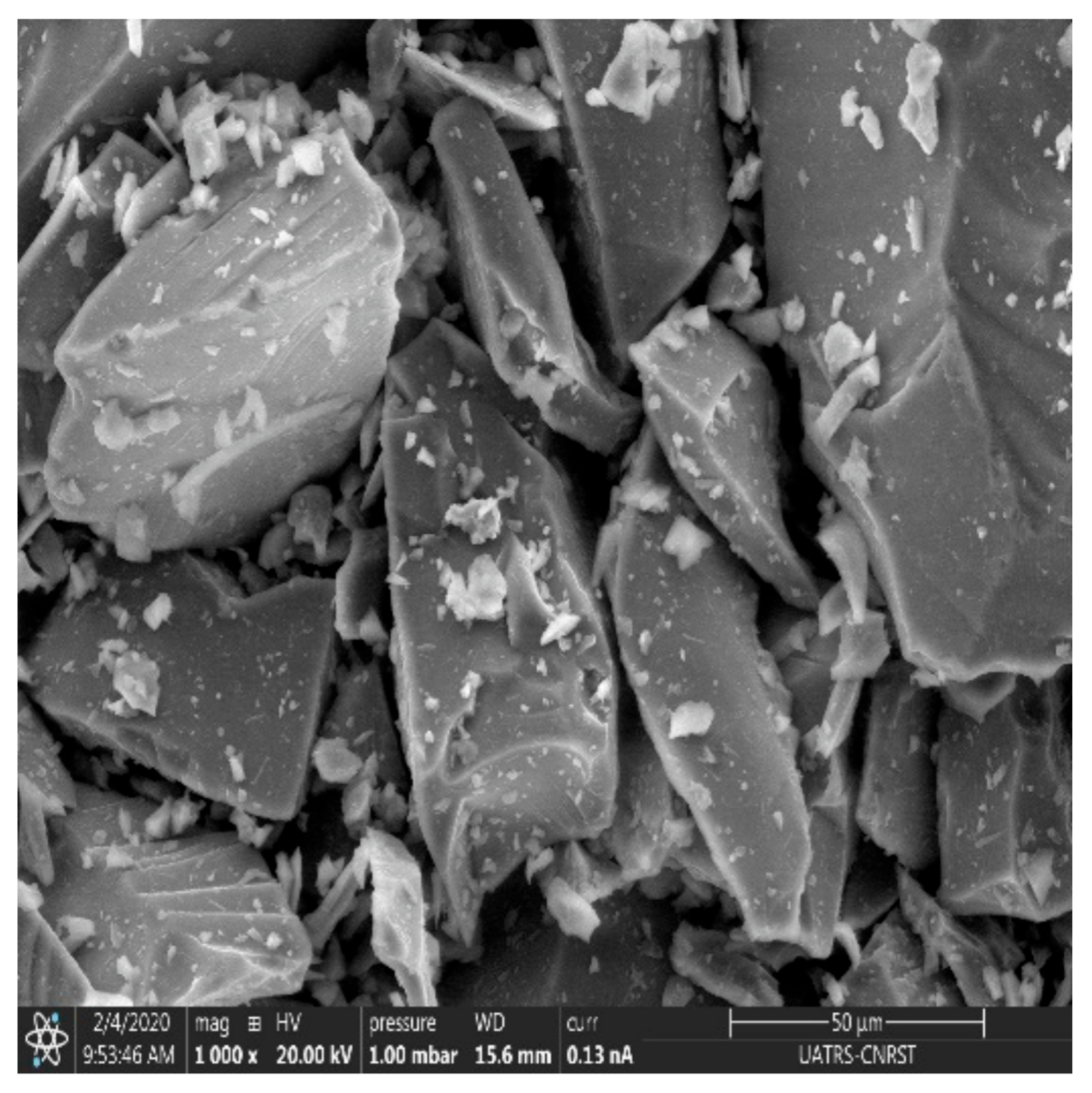
Scanning electron microscopy of glass powder originated from glass bottles

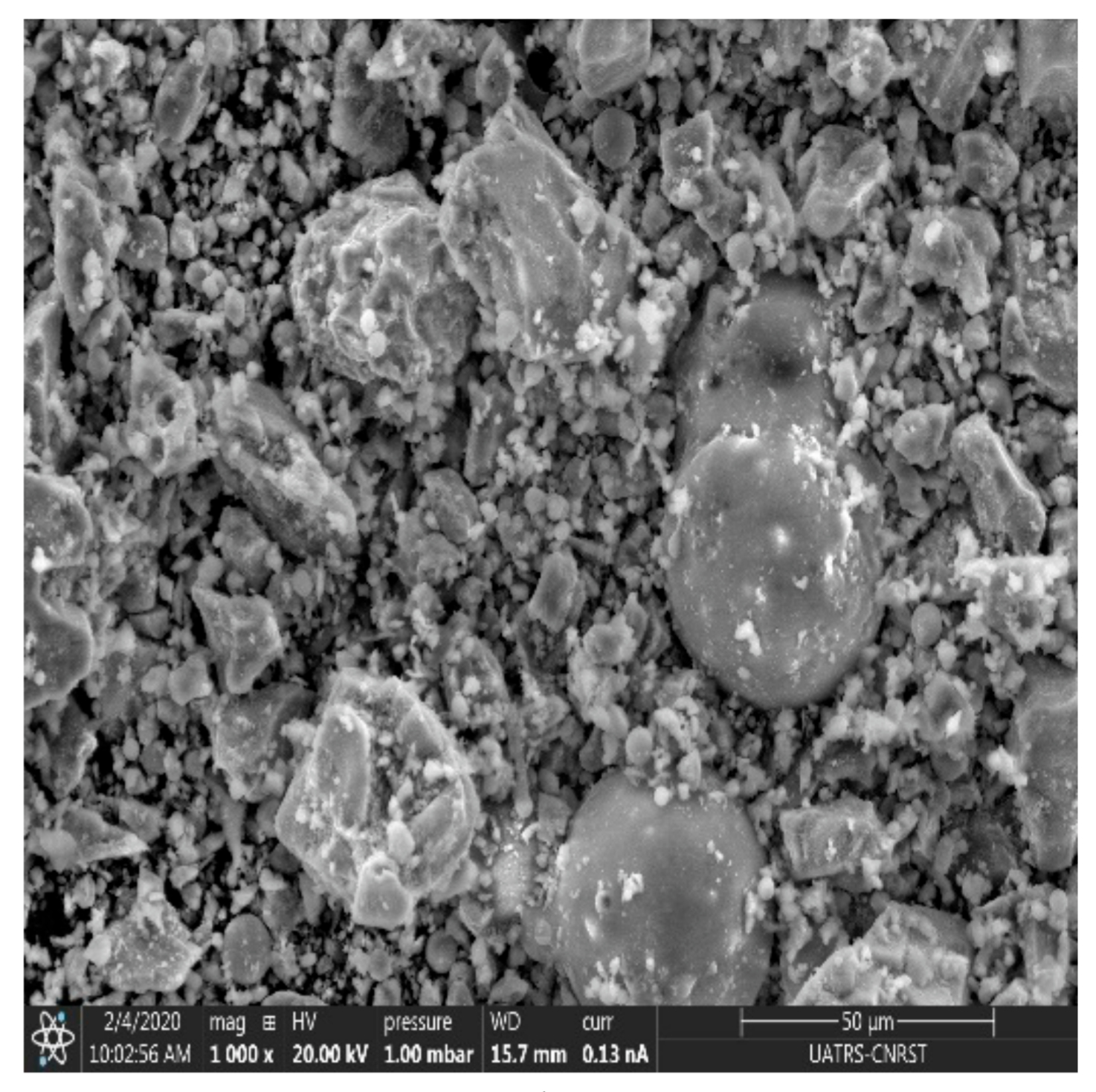
Scanning electron microscopy of cement

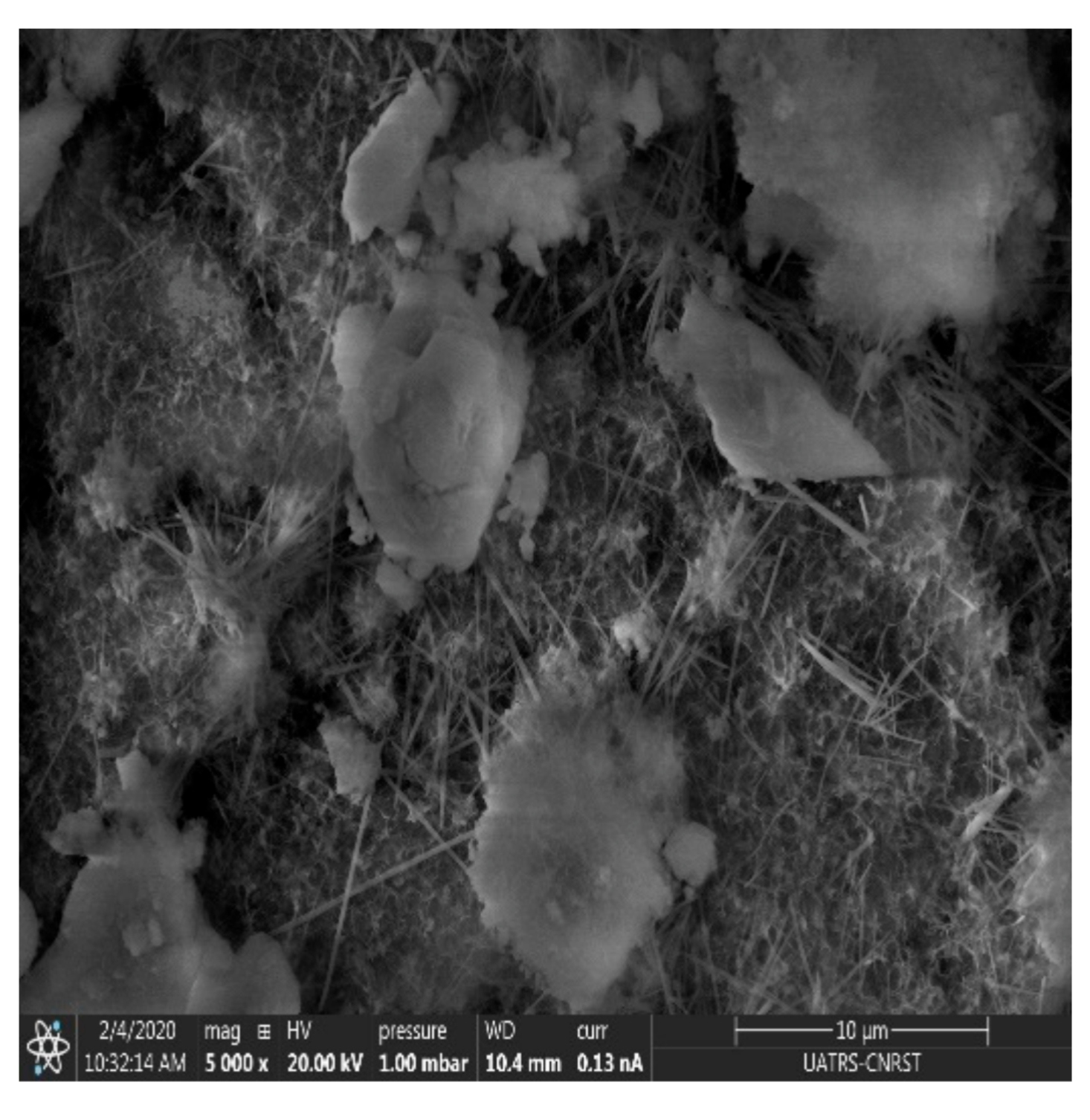
Scanning electron microscopy of mortar glass powder (10%) which seems to have fibre-like structure

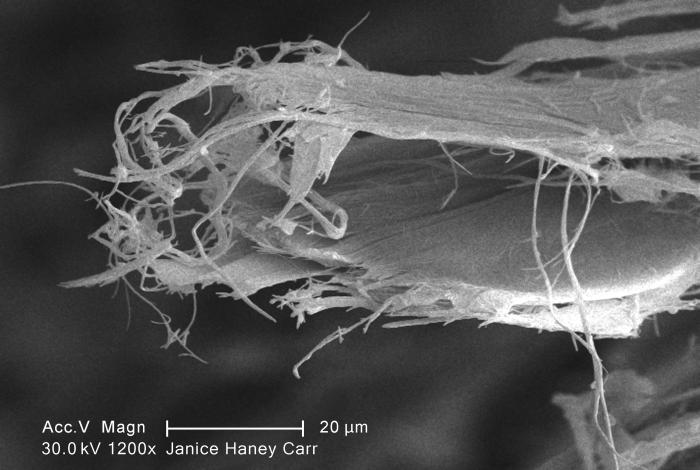
Scanning electron microscopy of white asbestos with needle-like shape fibre

==== Solubility ====
Particulates vary in chemical composition, containing both soluble and insoluble materials. Particle size, shape, and stickiness can change due to a particle's ability to absorb moisture from its surroundings, in outdoor or indoor air or within the respiratory system. In the lungs, uptake, clearance, retention, and systemic distribution of particulate matter (in the form of gases, vapors, particles or droplets) is highly complex and involves a variety of mechanisms in different areas of the respiratory system.

Respiration and diffusion bring particulate matter into the airways, where particles can be deposited onto airway surfaces such as epithelial tissue and dissolved into the bronchial and pulmonary circulation. Particles that are deposited on airway surfaces can be cleared through respiration, move to other locations within the respiratory tract, or remain trapped and cause irritation or toxicity. From the respiratory system, particulate matter can travel through veins and arteries to the heart, brain, muscle, skin, kidneys, gastrointestinal tract, spleen, liver, bone, and fat.

Solubility is important in determining the site and extent of absorption of inhaled gases and vapors. Particles with high solubility in lung fluid are either rapidly absorbed through the alveolar epithelium or removed by mucociliary clearance in the upper airways. Particles are also removed by alveolar macrophages in the pulmonary region. The behavior of particulates also can be affected by meteorological conditions. Absorption is dependent upon air flow rates and the partial pressure of the gases in the inspired air. Inhalation also depends upon the breathing rate and breathing mode of the subject.

The fate of a specific contaminant is dependent upon the form in which it exists (aerosol or particle). Water-soluble organic compounds include alcohols, carboxylic acids, keto acids, phenols and hydroxylamines, while insoluble organic compounds include aliphatic hydrocarbons, polycyclic aromatic hydrocarbons (PAHs), and polycyclic aromatic ketones. Water-soluble inorganic ions account for 30% to 50% of PM_{2.5} mass concentration, with sulfate, nitrate, and ammonium salts being the most abundant.

=== Mechanisms of health effects ===
The upper respiratory tract (URT) is the main point where particulate matter can enter the human body. Due to its size, PM_{10} tends to be limited to the upper airways, including the nose, throat, and bronchi. PM_{2.5} and PM_{0.1} are smaller and may travel deeper into the lungs, entering small airways and reaching the alveoli. As a result, they cause different and greater harms to health.

External videos
- "Alveoli: Gas Exchange", Science Sauce.

Alveoli are air sacs deep in the lungs, where oxygen from inhaled air enters the bloodstream and carbon dioxide is released. The walls of the alveoli are formed of epithelial cells, which are surrounded by capillaries of the bloodstream. This thin air-blood barrier supports diffusion between the lungs and the bloodstream. Alveoli have a fluid-coated surface that helps them to inflate properly and maintain their shape.

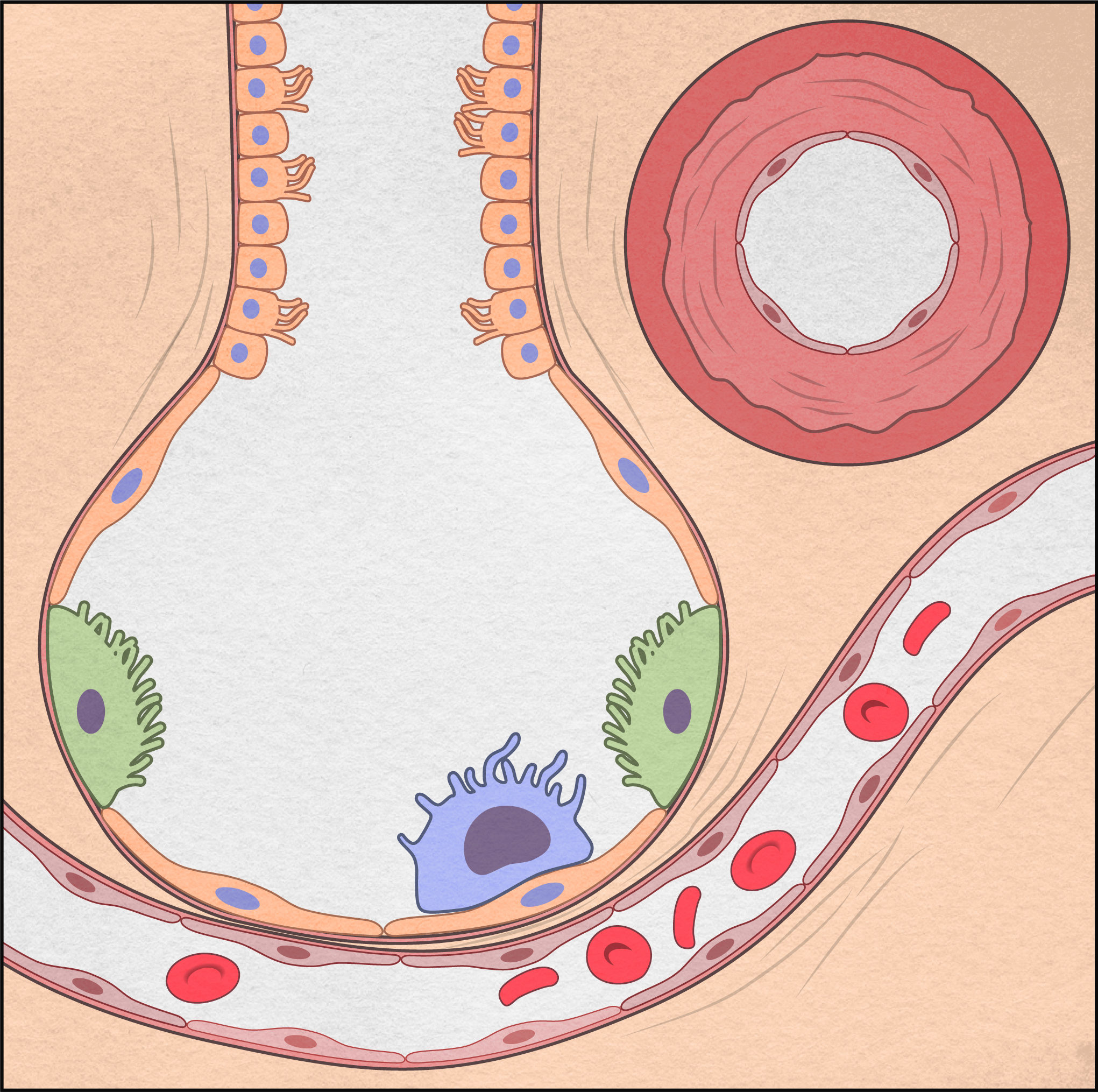
Alveolar macrophages (blue/green) in alveoli

Immune cells called macrophages protect tissues through innate immune responses, detecting, surrounding and digesting inhaled particulate matter and cellular debris. Alveolar macrophages adapt to environmental cues by managing inflammatory responses. They react in ways that can be either pro-inflammatory (M1) to fight infections or anti-inflammatory (M2) to promote tissue repair. They also manage adaptive immune responses involving future recognition and response to harmful substances. This can lead to either increased immune response or increased tolerance of challenges. Alveolar macrophages are essential in maintaining a stable environment to support gas exchange in the alveoli, attempting to balance attacks on pathogens with prevention of cell damage.

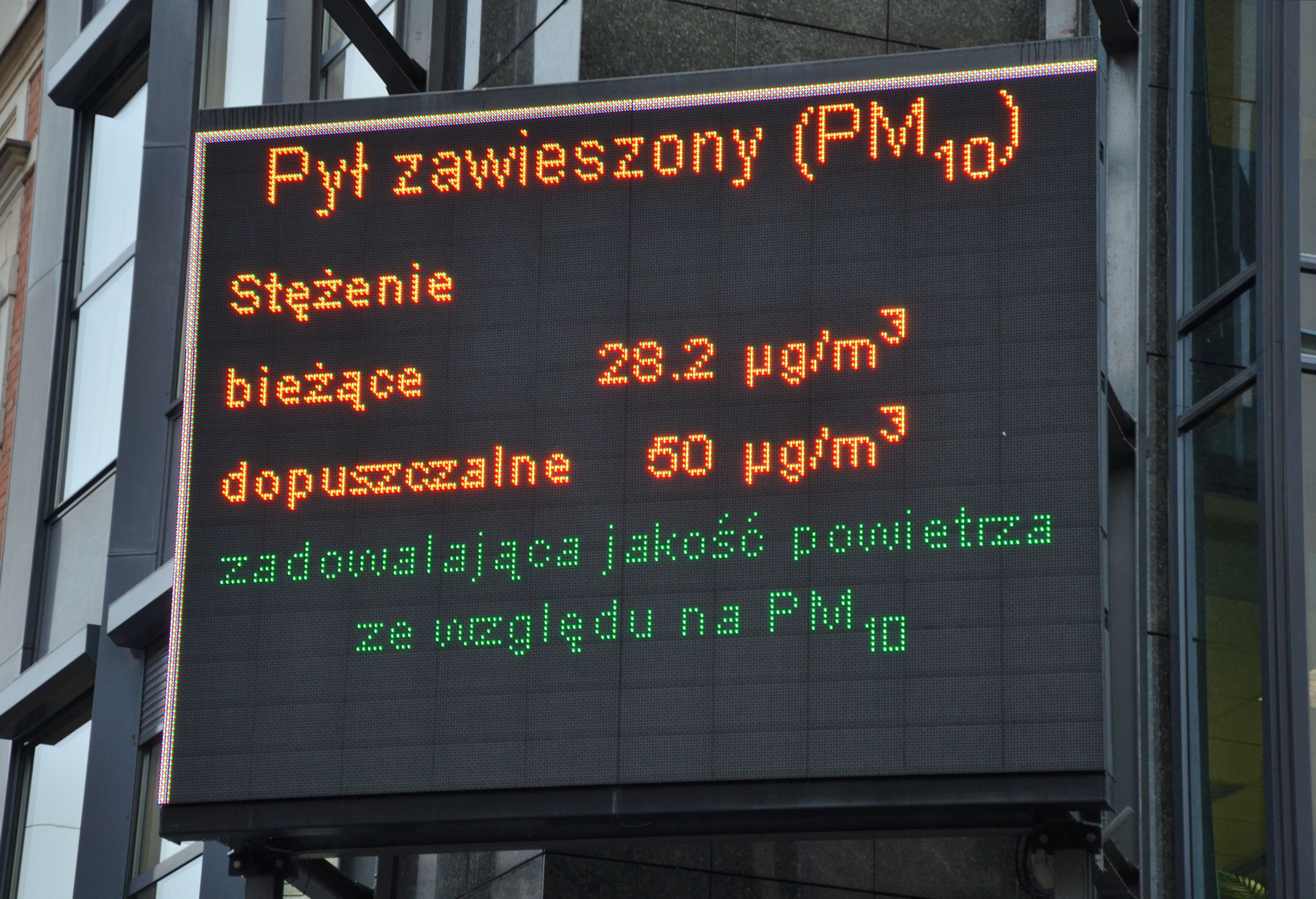
Air quality information on PM_{10} displayed in Katowice, Poland

Particulate matter can carry toxic substances and harmful microbes into the lungs and upset the balance of beneficial microbes and cellular activities. Both PM_{10} and PM_{2.5} trigger acute inflammatory responses involving release of proinflammatory cytokines. They also induce production of reactive oxygen species (ROS) which cause oxidative stress and damage cells, triggering further inflammation. They can interfere with the work of macrophages in managing detection and removal of particulate matter, inflammation, tissue repair, and adaptive immune responses. PM_{10} is related to increases in upper respiratory tract symptoms such as runny nose, cough and sneezing. It increases susceptibility to respiratory infections and inflammatory respiratory disorders of the nasal cavity (e.g. allergic rhinitis and chronic rhinosinusitis).

Fine particulate matter (PM_{2.5} and ultrafine particulates) can reach the lower lungs and alveoli. In the lower airways, particles are retained longer and cause more damage. In the upper respiratory tract, PM_{2.5} is linked to damage to airway epithelial cells and disruption of their functions. In the lower respiratory tract it can destroy alveolar epithelial cells. Mechanisms by which PM_{2.5} causes harms include oxidative stress, inflammatory responses, cytokine release, DNA damage, changes in gene expression, immunotoxicity, and apoptosis. Long-term damage to lung tissues can result from accelerated cell death, tissue scarring (fibrosis), reduced lung elasticity, and structural remodeling.

Some PM_{2.5} and ultrafine particulates can cross the air-blood barrier to enter the bloodstream. From there, they can travel throughout the body. Systemic harms occur as a result of the movement of particles into the cardiovascular system and on to other organs including the brain. Particulates may cause tissue damage directly in specific organs, or indirectly as a result of systemic inflammation.

Particulate matter that is caught by the mucociliary system and removed from the lungs can be swallowed and reach the intestines, affecting the gastrointestinal system. Particulate matter has been linked to inflammatory bowel disease (IBD), colorectal cancer, appendicitis, and chronic kidney and liver diseases.

Regarding specific contaminants, water-soluble inorganic ions like sulfate, nitrate, and ammonium salts can penetrate deep into the lungs and travel through the bloodstream. Sulfate has been linked to platelet aggregation and vascular endothelial cell damage. Ammonium salts stimulate the growth of blood vessel wall cells and blood vessel narrowing through chronic inflammation and oxidative stress. All three are linked to increased risk of ischemic stroke and other health problems. They affect health through mechanisms including chronic inflammation, oxidative stress, platelet aggregation and vascular endothelial cell injury. Carbon-containing components affect accelerated plaque formation, atherosclerosis, cardiac autonomic function, and platelet aggregation. Inorganic elements are involved in neural disturbances, genetic mutations, and disruption of homeostasis and biological processes.

Toxic components in PM_{2.5} can include polycyclic aromatic hydrocarbons (PAHs), aliphatic chlorinated hydrocarbons, oxygen-containing organic compounds such as ketones and quinones, and heavy metals like arsenic, cadmium, chromium, copper, lead, nickel, and zinc. Toxic components in PM_{2.5} disrupt the activity of macrophages and are associated with the development of cancers. Heavy metals disrupt cellular activity and increase the production of reactive oxygen species (ROS), while organic pollutants like PAHs activate the aryl hydrocarbon receptor (AhR) pathway inducing vascular toxicity. When these components of particulate matter occur together, they act synergistically to cause even greater cellular damage.

Increased levels of fine particles in the air as a result of anthropogenic particulate air pollution are "consistently and independently related to the most serious effects". Quantity and duration of exposure affect processes and outcomes. Adverse effects may occur at exposure levels lower than those recommended in published air quality standards.

=== Impacts on health ===
Exposure to particulate matter, a modifiable risk factor, is linked to diseases throughout the body. It affects the respiratory system (asthma, chronic obstructive pulmonary disease, lung cancer, pulmonary fibrosis, pneumonia, acute respiratory distress syndrome rhinosinusitis and silicosis), the cardiovascular system (heart attacks, hypertension, arrhythmias, and atherosclerosis), the nervous system (cognitive impairment, cognitive decline, neurodegenerative diseases such as Alzheimer's disease, mental disorders,), the gastrointestinal system (inflammatory bowel disease, colorectal cancer, appendicitis, kidney and liver diseases), and metabolic system (diabetes, metabolic syndrome, breast cancer), and the reproductive system. The effects of particulate matter have been studied in connection with premature delivery, birth defects, low birth weight, and developmental disorders. Air pollution has also been linked to a range of psychosocial problems including violence and crime.

==== Death ====
Deaths from air pollution compared to other common causes in Indonesia, USA, India and China in 2019

According to the State of Global Air 2025 report, air pollution (including particulate matter from both outdoor and household sources) is the leading environmental risk factor for death world-wide. The association between particulate pollution and large numbers of premature deaths and other health problems was first demonstrated in the early 1970s and has been reproduced many times since. Both short-term exposure (hours to a few days) and long-term exposure (months to years) to PM_{10} and PM_{2.5} have negative effects. Over all causes of mortality, PM_{2.5} has more severe health effects than PM_{10}.

In 2023, 7.9 million deaths worldwide (approximately 1 in 8) were attributable to the effects of air pollution. 4.9 million were attributable to outdoor PM_{2.5} exposure, and another 2.8 million to household exposure. Of all pollution-related deaths, 86% overall and 95% of adults over 60 years of age were associated with the development and worsening of noncommunicable diseases such as COPD, dementia, diabetes, heart disease, and lung disease.

The 2021 Global Burden of Disease Study (GBD) reported that outdoor fine particulates with diameter less than 2.5 microns (PM_{2.5}) accounted for 7.83 million deaths and 231.51 million disability-adjusted life-years lost (DALYs) globally in 2021. PM_{2.5} was identified as a major health risk factor globally.

In 2023, PM_{2.5} contributed to an estimated 182,000 premature deaths in the European Union. This was a decrease of 57% compared to the effects of PM_{2.5} in 2005. The decrease is attributed to changes in policies that led to a 38% decline in total emissions of primary PM_{2.5} between 2005 and 2023.

In China, passage of the Air Pollution Prevention and Control Action Plan (APPCAP) in 2013 led to a one-third decrease in annual average PM_{2.5} concentrations and fewer deaths between 2013 and 2017. However PM_{2.5} continues to be a major environmental health risk in China, responsible for 2.27 million deaths and 46.68 million disability-adjusted life years (DALYs) in 2021.

In the United States, amendments to the Clean Air Act in 1970 resulted in decreases in PM_{2.5} levels and increases in life expectancy, as was shown by the Harvard Six Cities Study and others. However, since 2016, PM_{2.5} concentrations are no longer decreasing in the U.S. In 2017, pollution was estimated to account for nearly 197,000 deaths in the United States. A 2022 study in GeoHealth concluded that eliminating energy-related fossil fuel emissions in the United States would prevent 46,900–59,400 premature deaths each year and provide $537–678 billion in benefits from avoided PM_{2.5}-related illness and death.

There are interactions between particulate matter, exercise, and mortality. The health benefits of physical exercise may be affected by air quality. A 2025 cross-national study involving 1.5 million adults demonstrated that high levels of ambient PM_{2.5} can significantly diminish the protective effects of leisure-time physical activity against all-cause and cause-specific mortality. Below an annual average concentration of 25 μg/m^{3}, regular exercise reduces all-cause mortality by approximately 30%. This benefit is halved (to 12–15%) when concentrations exceeded 25 μg/m^{3}. In addition, the protective effects of exercise against cancer-related mortality become statistically non-significant when PM_{2.5} levels reach 35 μg/m^{3} or higher.

==== Respiratory system ====
Though the rate of exposure to ground-level ozone ("smog") and small-particulate matter ("soot") has been declining, in 2026, nearly half of people in the US under age 18 live in an area receiving a failing grade for at least one measure of air pollution.

Particulate matter is associated with respiratory diseases including asthma, chronic obstructive pulmonary disease, pulmonary fibrosis, pneumonia, acute respiratory distress syndrome, and lung cancer. PM_{10} rarely travels beyond the upper airway, while finer particulates such as PM_{2.5} and PM_{0.1} can go deeper into the lungs and cause greater harms to respiratory health.

The Multi-City Multi-Country (MCC) study examined daily data on mortality and air pollution from 652 cities in 24 areas, including North America, Europe, and Eastern Asia. PM_{2.5} concentrations were associated with higher overall and respiratory mortality. Similar results are reported by other studies.

The IARC and WHO designate particulates as a Group 1 carcinogen. A 2024 meta-analysis of 66 cancer studies globally reported that for every increase of 10 μg/m^{3} in PM_{2.5}, the lung cancer rate rose 8.5%. Air pollution is also associated with higher incidence and prevalence, worsening of symptoms, and more exacerbations in asthma, COPD and other conditions.

Short-term exposure is also associated with increased emergency room visits and hospitalizations relating to asthma, COPD, upper respiratory infections (URI), and pneumonia. For example, a 10 μg/m3 increase in daily PM_{2.5} was associated with a 1.5% increase in asthma-related emergency room visits by adults and a 3.6% increase in pediatric emergency room visits.

Airborne particulate matter can carry microbes into the respiratory system and increase the risk of respiratory infections and allergic reactions. PM_{2.5} suppresses immune responses and worsens inflammation, increasing severity and mortality of bacterial and viral infections in the respiratory system. PM_{2.5} worsens bacterial infections like Staphylococcus aureus, Streptococcus pneumoniae, Mycobacterium tuberculosis, Pseudomonas aeruginosa and Mycoplasma pneumoniae. Particulate matter also interferes with immune responses that fight viral infections like COVID-19. PM_{2.5} has been found to promote allergic reactions and cytokine storms during respiratory viral infections.

==== Cardiovascular system ====
Particulate matter is associated with increases in blood pressure, blood clotting, and insulin resistance; damage to the endothelial cells that line blood vessels, causing vascular injury or dysfunction; accelerated buildup of fatty plaques in arteries, and reduced elasticity of arteries.

Effects on the microvasculature have also been observed in children. A 2017 panel study of healthy schoolchildren aged 8–12 years found that higher same-day exposure to PM2.5 was associated with narrower retinal arterioles, while some exposure measures were also associated with wider retinal venules. A 2026 longitudinal study of healthy schoolchildren similarly found that higher short-term indoor PM2.5 exposure was associated with reduced microvascular dilatation.

PM_{2.5} has been shown to increase both oxidative stress and inflammation. Oxidative stress decreases availability of nitric oxide, needed to maintain the elasticity of blood vessels. Chronic inflammation damages blood vessel walls, interfering with their ability to relax and regulate pressure.

PM_{2.5} is associated with increased cardiovascular illness and mortality from diseases such as ischemic heart disease, cerebrovascular disease (stroke), heart failure, arrhythmia, heart attack, atherosclerosis, and hypertension. PM_{2.5} is also associated with increased cardiovascular-related hospital admissions.

In 2022, a systematic review and analysis of 27 studies with approximately 42 million participants reported that each 10 μg/m^{3} increase in long-term PM_{2.5} exposure was associated with a 21% higher risk of developing hypertension over time. A 2020 analysis of cause-specific cardiovascular disease mortality reported that each increase of 10 μg/m3 in PM_{2.5} was associated with a 16% increase in mortality from ischaemic heart disease and a 14% increase in mortality from stroke.

==== Nervous system ====
The effects of air pollution and particulate matter on cognitive performance are an active area of research. A 2020 meta-analysis reported increased cognitive impairment with increments of 5 μg/m^{3} of PM_{2.5}. A 2025 meta-analysis indicates that every 1 μg/m^{3} increase in PM_{2.5}, PM_{10}, PM_{1} and black carbon is associated with decreased cognitive function. Meta-analysis and reviews also indicate that exposure to PM_{2.5}, PM_{10}, and SO_{2} are associated with decreases in global cognitive function and with cognitive decline. Epidemiological studies also suggest a link between PM_{2.5} exposure and cognitive decline. PM_{2.5} is associated with reduced cognitive function in children, as measured by IQ scores. Improved air quality has been found to have a protective effect on cognitive function.

Long-term PM_{2.5} exposure is associate with increased risk for all-cause dementia, Alzheimer's disease and Parkinson's disease. PM_{10} is also associated with increased risk of vascular dementia. Risk of Alzheimer's disease is associated with PM_{2.5}, and is higher in heavily polluted regions than in lightly polluted regions. There is also a strong association between Parkinson's disease and PM_{2.5}. Higher rates of Parkinson's disease are generally associated with higher levels of PM_{2.5}.

Air pollution may increase the risk of mental disorders such as depression, anxiety, schizophrenia, bipolar disorder and psychosis, and of suicide. Increases in symptoms and behaviors may be related to underlying changes in neurotransmitters and neuromodulators. Relationships between depression, suicide, and air pollution are complicated. For example, daily increases in both temperature and air pollution have been found to increase the risk of death from suicide, with stronger effects for women than men. Air pollution is also associated with increased levels of violence and crime.

Air pollution may increase the risk of neurodevelopmental disorders such as autism. A review and meta-analysis including 20 studies reports an increased risk of autism spectrum disorders (ASD) in children following exposures to PM_{2.5} prenatally and for the first year and second years after birth. ASD and Attention Deficit Hyperactivity Disorder (ADHD) have been linked to early-life exposures to both PM_{2.5} and NO_{2}.

While mechanisms connecting PM_{2.5} exposure and cognitive decline are not fully understood, research suggests that particulate matter may reach the brain via multiple pathways, including inhalation, ingestion, and the olfactory system. Respiratory inflammation can lead to systematic inflammation, interfering with the blood–brain barrier and enabling toxins and other materials to enter the brain. There, particulate matter causes damage as a result of neuroinflammation, oxidative stress, buildup of misfolded proteins, and neuronal cell death.

==== Gastrointestinal and metabolic systems ====
In the gastrointestinal system, particulate matter is linked to inflammatory bowel disease, colorectal cancer, appendicitis, and kidney and liver diseases. PM_{2.5} can enter the gastrointestinal tract by being ingested in food or water. It can also be inhaled into the respiratory tract and cleared from the lungs in mucus, which is then swallowed and reaches the gastrointestinal tract. PM_{2.5} that has entered the bloodstream via the lungs can travel to the gut through systemic circulation. PM_{2.5} increases systemic inflammation and oxidative stress. These mechanisms disrupt the intestinal barrier, increasing intestinal permeability and enabling harmful substances to enter the circulatory system and affect the immune system. PM_{2.5} exposure alters the composition of gut microbiota, increasing the presence of Lactobacillus, Parabacteroides, Firmicutes and Akkermansia, and decreasing Bacteroidetes and Prevotella. Changes in microbiota and metabolites impair function and gut health. High-risk constituents such as toxic heavy metals and organic compounds cause further harms.

Particulate matter is also linked to diabetes. Exposure to PM_{10} and PM_{2.5} has been shown to increase the risk of type 2 diabetes. As of 2025, little research was available on effects in type 1 diabetes mellitus and gestational diabetes mellitus. Microbiota imbalance and decreases in gut microbiota diversity may worsen insulin resistance and affect type 2 diabetes.

There is some evidence to suggest that particulate matter is a risk factor for Metabolic syndrome (MetS). MetS involves multiple metabolic-related disorders: central obesity, high blood pressure, high fasting glucose, and low high-density lipoprotein cholesterol (low-HDL). PM_{2.5} and chemical components such as sulfates and black carbon may affect MetS-related disorders.

==== Reproductive system ====
Particulate matter and PM_{2.5} exposure have been studied with respect to the reproductive system. Reduced sperm counts, irregular menstruation, and higher rates of infertility in both men and women have been correlated with exposure to particulates. PM_{2.5} has been shown to disrupt hormone levels and decrease the supply of eggs in a woman's ovaries. PM_{2.5} accumulates in the reproductive organs and can cause male infertility.

Pregnant women exposed to PM_{2.5} are at higher risk for developing gestational diabetes and hypertensive diseases of pregnancy such as gestational hypertension and pre-eclampsia. Exposure to particulate matter is also associated with increased risk of spontaneous abortion, premature delivery, low birth weight, and birth defects. Maternal PM_{2.5} exposure during pregnancy is associated with high blood pressure in children.

Overall epidemiologic and toxicological evidence suggests causal relationships between long-term exposure to fine and ultrafine particulate matter and adverse outcomes in offspring. Particulate matter exposure can cause inflammation, oxidative stress, endocrine disruption, and impaired transport across the placenta, all of which can lower birth weight. Smaller forms of particulate matter, including black carbon and microplastics, can cross the placental barrier and cause harms during placental development. Particulate matter from wildfire smoke leads to alterations in placental function and negative outcomes in pregnancy.

Studies that attempt to further associate the effects of particulate matter with exposure during specific trimesters have shown varied results. Perinatal exposure is associated with lifelong health outcomes.

==== Wildfire smoke effects ====
Smoke from wildfires may more seriously affect sensitive groups such as the elderly, children, pregnant women, and people with lung, and cardiovascular disease. Wildfires are associated with increased emergency department visits due to particulate matter exposure, as well as an increased risk of asthma related events. Particulate matter from wildfires can be a triggering factor of acute coronary events such as ischemic heart disease. PM_{2.5} from wildfires is linked to an increased risk of hospitalizations for cardiopulmonary diseases. Evidence also suggests that wildfire smoke reduces mental performance.

==== Racial disparities ====
There have been many studies linking race to increased proximity to particulate matter emissions sources and adverse health effects such as asthma. Black populations are located disproportionately closer to areas of high PM output than White populations. Residential proximity to particulate emitting facilities increases exposure to PM_{2.5} and rates of illness and death. Multiple studies confirm that the burden of PM emissions is higher among populations that are non-White or living in poverty. Socioeconomic conditions are not sufficient to explain these differences: disparities for Blacks are more pronounced than disparities on the basis of income.

In the United States, this disproportionality is attributed by scholars to racial housing segregation and inequalities in toxic exposures, a long-standing environmental justice problem linked to the practice of historic redlining. Health effects are further worsened because "health care occurs in the context of broader historic and contemporary social and economic inequality and persistent racial and ethnic discrimination in many sectors of American life".

One example is an area of Southeastern Louisiana, colloquially dubbed 'Cancer Alley' for its high concentration of cancer related deaths due to neighboring chemical plants. Cancer Alley is a majority African American community, with the neighborhood nearest to the plant being 90% Black. Long-term health effects of living in high PM concentrations have increased both illness and mortality rates, which were further worsened by COVID-19. Such outcomes reflect a history of racism.

== Vegetation effects ==
Dendrochronology studies history through the rings of trees and the chemistry of wood.

The release of particulate matter into the environment affects both terrestrial and aquatic ecosystems. Particulate matter can settle from the air onto plants, ground, and water. Ultrafine particles can enter plants via both leaves and root systems, travel throughout plants, and affect their physical and chemical processes. The deposition of trace elements from pollution into the rings of trees can be used by dendrochronologists to reconstruct a pollution history, a historical record of changes in soils, sediments and the atmosphere.

Particulate matter can physically block sunlight from entering leaves, preventing photosynthesis. It can clog stomatal openings of plants and interfere with photosynthesis and transpiration functions. Particulate matter can damage plant cells and stunt or kill some plant species.

Damage from particulate matter can reduce productivity of crops. Plants can absorb and retain particulate matter, removing it from the air and improving the quality of the air we breathe. However, this also means that particulate matter such as heavy metals can contaminate plants such as leafy vegetables above safe levels for human consumption.

== Climate effects ==
Aerosols have a cooling effect that is small compared to the radiative forcing (warming effect) of greenhouse gases.

Atmospheric aerosols affect the climate of the Earth by changing the amount of incoming solar radiation and outgoing terrestrial longwave radiation retained in the Earth's system. This occurs through several distinct mechanisms which are split into direct, indirect and semi-direct aerosol effects. The aerosol climate effects are the biggest source of uncertainty in future climate predictions. The Intergovernmental Panel on Climate Change (IPCC) stated in 2001:

While the radiative forcing due to greenhouse gases may be determined to a reasonably high degree of accuracy... the uncertainties relating to aerosol radiative forcings remain large, and rely to a large extent on the estimates from global modeling studies that are difficult to verify at the present time.

=== Aerosol radiative ===
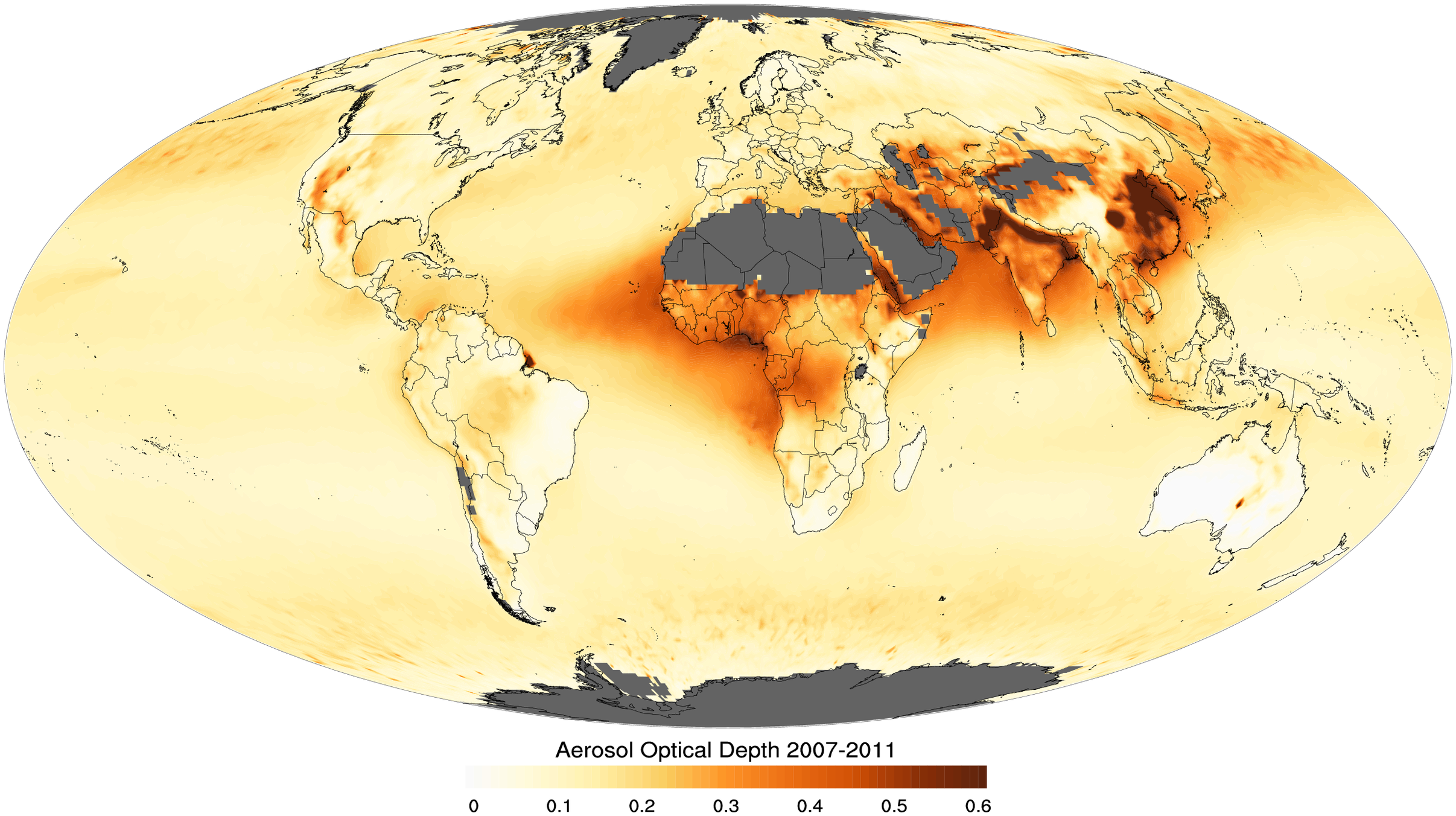
Global aerosol optical thickness. The aerosol scale (yellow to dark reddish-brown) indicates the relative amount of particles that absorb sunlight.

Average monthly aerosol amounts around the world, observations from the Moderate Resolution Imaging Spectroradiometer (MODIS) on NASA's Terra satellite.

==== Direct ====
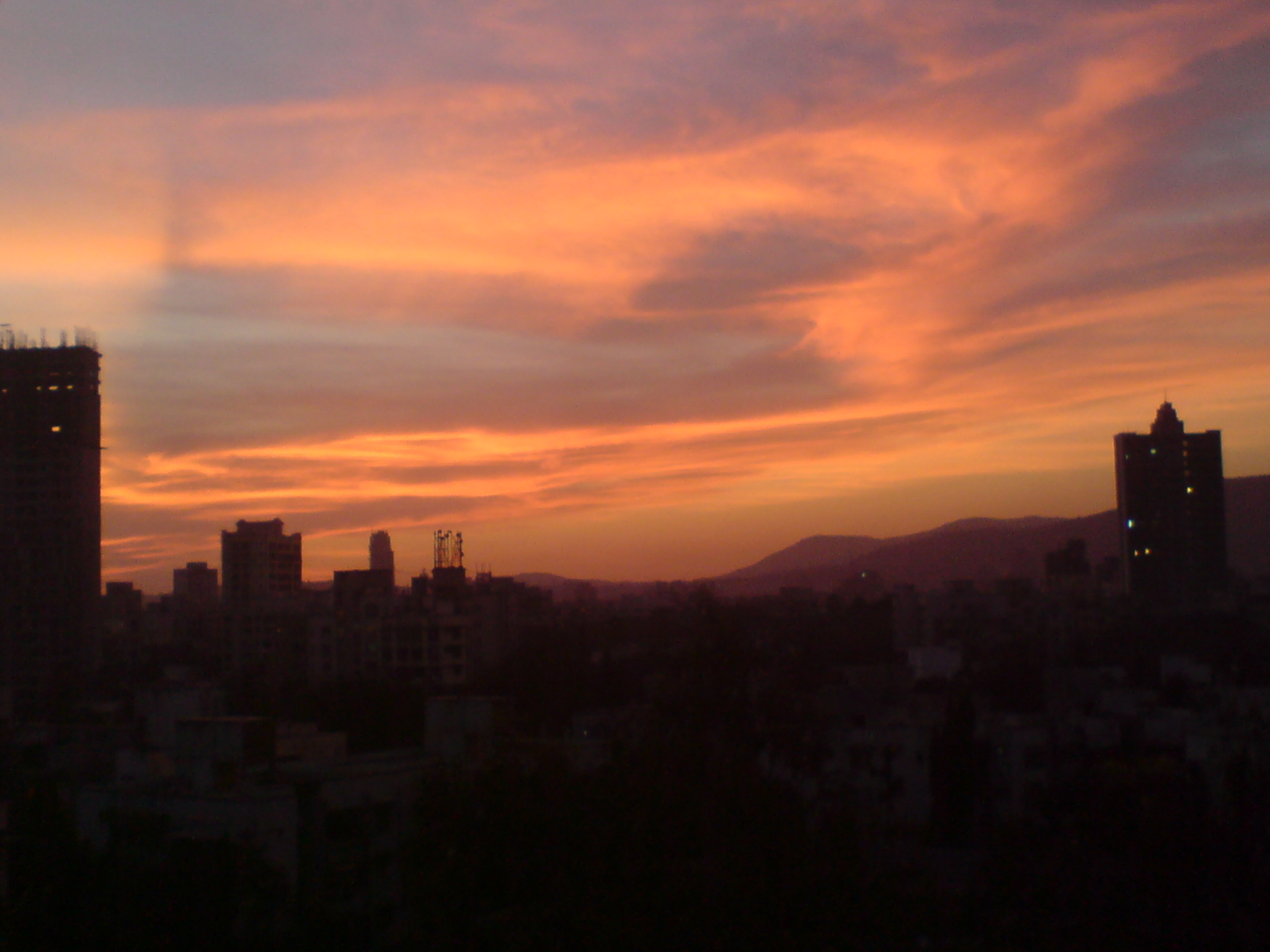
Particulates in the air causing shades of orange, yellow, pink, and grey in Mumbai during sunset

Italian city polluted by particulates and optic air detector (laser)

The direct aerosol effect consists of any direct interaction of radiation with atmospheric aerosols, such as absorption or scattering. It affects both short and longwave radiation to produce a net negative radiative forcing. The magnitude of the resultant radiative forcing due to the direct effect of an aerosol is dependent on the albedo of the underlying surface, as this affects the net amount of radiation absorbed or scattered to space. For example, if a highly scattering aerosol is above a surface of low albedo it has a greater radiative forcing than if it was above a surface of high albedo. The converse is true of absorbing aerosol, with the greatest radiative forcing arising from a highly absorbing aerosol over a surface of high albedo. The direct aerosol effect is a first-order effect and is therefore classified as a radiative forcing by the IPCC. The interaction of an aerosol with radiation is quantified by the single-scattering albedo (SSA), the ratio of scattering alone to scattering plus absorption (extinction) of radiation by a particle. The SSA tends to unity if scattering dominates, with relatively little absorption, and decreases as absorption increases, becoming zero for infinite absorption. For example, the sea-salt aerosol has an SSA of 1, as a sea-salt particle only scatters, whereas soot has an SSA of 0.23, showing that it is a major atmospheric aerosol absorber.

==== Indirect ====
The Indirect aerosol effect consists of any change to the Earth's radiative budget due to the modification of clouds by atmospheric aerosols and consists of several distinct effects. Cloud droplets form onto pre-existing aerosol particles, known as cloud condensation nuclei (CCN). Droplets condensing around human-produced aerosols such as found in particulate pollution tend to be smaller and more numerous than those forming around aerosol particles of natural origin (such as windblown dust).

For any given meteorological conditions, an increase in CCN leads to an increase in the number of cloud droplets. This leads to more scattering of shortwave radiation i.e. an increase in the albedo of the cloud, known as the cloud albedo effect, First indirect effect or Twomey effect. Evidence supporting the cloud albedo effect has been observed from the effects of ship exhaust plumes and biomass burning on cloud albedo compared to ambient clouds. The Cloud albedo aerosol effect is a first order effect and therefore classified as a radiative forcing by the IPCC.

An increase in cloud droplet number due to the introduction of aerosol acts to reduce the cloud droplet size, as the same amount of water is divided into more droplets. This has the effect of suppressing precipitation, increasing the cloud lifetime, known as the cloud lifetime aerosol effect, second indirect effect or Albrecht effect. This has been observed as the suppression of drizzle in ship exhaust plume compared to ambient clouds, and inhibited precipitation in biomass burning plumes. This cloud lifetime effect is classified as a climate feedback (rather than a radiative forcing) by the IPCC due to the interdependence between it and the hydrological cycle. However, it has previously been classified as a negative radiative forcing.

==== Semi-direct ====
The Semi-direct effect concerns any radiative effect caused by absorbing atmospheric aerosol such as soot, apart from direct scattering and absorption, which is classified as the direct effect. It encompasses many individual mechanisms, and in general is more poorly defined and understood than the direct and indirect aerosol effects. For instance, if absorbing aerosols are present in a layer aloft in the atmosphere, they can heat surrounding air which inhibits the condensation of water vapour, resulting in less cloud formation. Additionally, heating a layer of the atmosphere relative to the surface results in a more stable atmosphere due to the inhibition of atmospheric convection. This inhibits the convective uplift of moisture, which in turn reduces cloud formation. The heating of the atmosphere aloft also leads to a cooling of the surface, resulting in less evaporation of surface water. The effects described here all lead to a reduction in cloud cover i.e. an increase in planetary albedo. The semi-direct effect classified as a climate feedback) by the IPCC due to the interdependence between it and the hydrological cycle. However, it has previously been classified as a negative radiative forcing.

=== Specific aerosol roles ===
==== Sulfate ====
Sulfate aerosols are mostly inorganic sulfur compounds like SO^{2−}_{4}, HSO^{−}_{4} and H_{2}SO_{4}, which are mainly produced when sulfur dioxide reacts with water vapor to form gaseous sulfuric acid and various salts (often through an oxidation reaction in the clouds), which are then thought to experience hygroscopic growth and coagulation and then shrink through evaporation. Some of them are biogenic (typically produced via atmospheric chemical reactions with dimethyl sulfide from mostly marine plankton) or geological via volcanoes or weather-driven from wildfires and other natural combustion events, but in the recent decades anthropogenic sulfate aerosols produced through combustion of fossil fuels with a high sulfur content, primarily coal and certain less-refined fuels, like aviation and bunker fuel, had dominated.

By 1990, global human-caused emissions of sulfur into the atmosphere became "at least as large" as all natural emissions of sulfur-containing compounds combined, and were at least 10 times more numerous than the natural aerosols in the most polluted regions of Europe and North America, where they accounted for 25% or more of all air pollution. This led to acid rain, and also contributed to heart and lung conditions and even the risk of preterm birth and low birth weight. Sulfate pollution also has a complex relationship with NOx pollution and ozone, reducing the also harmful ground-level ozone, yet capable of damaging the stratospheric ozone layer as well.

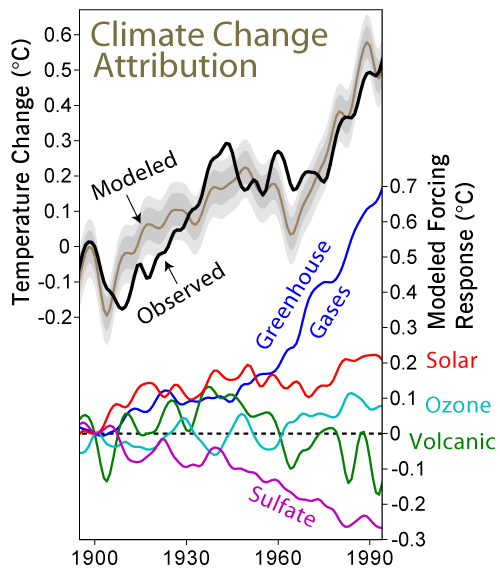
Stratospheric sulfates from volcanic emissions cause transient cooling; the purple line showing sustained cooling is from tropospheric sulfate pollution.

Once the problem became clear, the efforts to remove this pollution through flue-gas desulfurization measures and other pollution controls were largely successful, reducing their prevalence by 53% and causing healthcare savings valued at $50 billion annually in the United States alone. Yet, around the same time, research had shown that sulfate aerosols were affecting both the visible light received by the Earth and its surface temperature, and as the so-called global dimming) began to reverse in the 1990s in line with the reduced anthropogenic sulfate pollution, climate change accelerated.

As of 2021, the latest CMIP6 models estimate that total cooling from the currently present aerosols is between 0.1 °C (0.18 °F) to 0.7 °C (1.3 °F); the IPCC Sixth Assessment Report uses the best estimate of 0.5 °C (0.90 °F), with the uncertainty mainly caused by contradictory research on the impacts of aerosols of clouds.

Some are certain that they cool the planet, though, and this led to solar geoengineering proposals known as stratospheric aerosol injection, which seeks to replicate and enhance the cooling from sulfate pollution while minimizing the negative effects on health through deploying in the stratosphere, where only a fraction of the current sulfur pollution would be needed to avoid multiple degrees of warming, but the assessment of costs and benefits remains incomplete, even with hundreds of studies into the subject completed by the early 2020s.

==== Black carbon ====
Black carbon (BC) or elemental carbon (EC), often called soot, is composed of pure carbon clusters, skeleton balls and fullerenes, and is one of the most important absorbing aerosol species in the atmosphere. It should be distinguished from organic carbon (OC): clustered or aggregated organic molecules on their own or permeating an EC buckyball. Black carbon from fossil fuels is estimated by the IPCC in the Fourth Assessment Report of the IPCC, 4AR, to contribute a global mean radiative forcing of +0.2 W/m^{2} (was +0.1 W/m^{2} in the Second Assessment Report of the IPCC, SAR), with a range +0.1 to +0.4 W/m^{2}. A study published in 2013 however, states that "the best estimate for the industrial-era (1750 to 2005) direct radiative forcing of atmospheric black carbon is +0.71 W/m^{2} with 90% uncertainty bounds of (+0.08, +1.27) W/m^{2}" with "total direct forcing by all-black carbon sources, without subtracting the preindustrial background, is estimated as +0.88 (+0.17, +1.48) W/m^{2}".

=== Instances ===
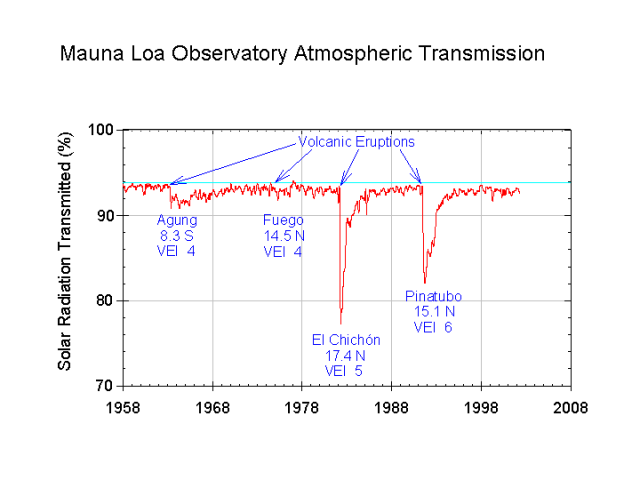
Solar radiation reduction due to volcanic eruptions

Volcanoes are a large natural source of aerosol and have been linked to changes in the Earth's climate often with consequences for the human population. Eruptions linked to changes in climate include the 1600 eruption of Huaynaputina which was linked to the Russian famine of 1601–1603, leading to the deaths of two million, and the 1991 eruption of Mount Pinatubo which caused a global cooling of approximately 0.5 °C lasting several years. Research tracking the effect of light-scattering aerosols in the stratosphere during 2000 and 2010 and comparing its pattern to volcanic activity show a close correlation. Simulations of the effect of anthropogenic particles showed little influence at present levels.

Aerosols are also thought to affect weather and climate on a regional scale. The failure of the Indian monsoon has been linked to the suppression of evaporation of water from the Indian Ocean due to the semi-direct effect of anthropogenic aerosol.

Recent studies of the Sahel drought and major increases since 1967 in rainfall in Australia over the Northern Territory, Kimberley, Pilbara and around the Nullarbor Plain have led some scientists to conclude that the aerosol haze over South and East Asia has been steadily shifting tropical rainfall in both hemispheres southward.

=== Energy industry knowledge and response to adverse health effects ===
Deaths caused by accidents and air pollution from fossil fuel use in power plants exceed those caused by production of renewable energy.

Major energy companies understood at least since the 1960s that use of their products causes widespread adverse health effects and death but continued aggressive political lobbying in the United States and elsewhere against clean air regulation and launched major corporate propaganda campaigns to sow doubt regarding the causative link between the burning of fossil fuels and major risks to human life. Internal company memoranda reveal that energy industry scientists and executives knew that air pollutants created by fossil fuels lodge deep in human lung tissue, and cause birth defects in children of oil industry workers. The industry memos acknowledge that automobiles "are by far the greatest sources of air pollution" and also that air pollution causes adverse health effects and lodges toxins, including carcinogens, "deep into the lungs which would otherwise be removed in the throat".

In response to mounting public concern, the industry eventually created the Global Climate Coalition, an industry lobby group, to derail governments' attempts to regulate air pollution and to create confusion in the public mind about the necessity of such regulation. Similar lobbying and corporate public relations efforts were undertaken by the American Petroleum Institute, a trade association of the oil and gas industry, and the climate change denier private think tank, The Heartland Institute. "The response from fossil-fuel interests has been from the same playbook – first they know, then they scheme, then they deny and then they delay. They've fallen back on delay, subtle forms of propaganda and the undermining of regulation," said Geoffrey Supran, a Harvard University researcher of the history of fossil-fuel companies and climate change. These efforts have been compared, by policy analysts such as Carroll Muffett of the Center for International Environmental Law, to the tobacco industry strategy of lobbying and corporate propaganda campaigns to create doubt regarding the causal connection between cigarette smoking and cancer and to forestall its regulation. In addition, industry-funded advocates, when appointed to senior government positions in the United States, have revised scientific findings showing the deadly effects of air pollution and have rolled back its regulation.

== Control ==
=== Technologies ===
Fabric filters Hepa effect: without (outdoor) and with filter (indoor)

Particulate matter emissions are highly regulated in most industrialized countries. Due to environmental concerns, most industries are required to operate some kind of dust collection system. These systems include inertial collectors (cyclonic separators), fabric filter collectors (baghouses), electrostatic filters used in facemasks, wet scrubbers, and electrostatic precipitators.

Cyclonic separators are useful for removing large, coarse particles and are often employed as a first step or "pre-cleaner" to other more efficient collectors. Well-designed cyclonic separators can be highly efficient in removing even fine particulates, and may be operated continuously without requiring frequent shutdowns for maintenance.

Fabric filters or baghouses are the most commonly employed in general industry. They work by forcing dust-laden air through a bag-shaped fabric filter leaving the particulate to collect on the outer surface of the bag and allowing the now clean air to pass through to either be exhausted into the atmosphere or in some cases recirculated into the facility. Common fabrics include polyester and fiberglass and common fabric coatings include PTFE (commonly known as Teflon). The excess dust buildup is then cleaned from the bags and removed from the collector.

Substantial amount of construction dust emitted and rising up from a building under rehabilitation on a Saturday afternoon, Treasure Garden, Tai Po, Hong Kong. The rehabilitation scheme is subsidised by the government and contract like this can worth up to a hundred million. People are living inside the building throughout the whole period of the renovation work, which usually lasts for over a year, and it can be foretold that the residents' exposure to construction dust is even more serious than the occupational exposure of the workers. The possible presence of asbestos and lead paint dust is also worth worrying. This type of rehabilitation works are very common (over 3000 buildings in the first 6 years of the scheme), especially in some older districts. With such a large amount of dust emitted, it was obvious that neither water was being sprayed nor dust extraction device was in use, which was a violation of the local law.

Wet scrubbers pass the dirty air through a scrubbing solution (usually a mixture of water and other compounds) allowing the particulate to attach to the liquid molecules. Electrostatic precipitators electrically charge the dirty air as it passes through. The now charged air then passes through large electrostatic plates which attract the charged particle in the airstream collecting them and leaving the now clean air to be exhausted or recirculated.

=== Measures ===
For general building construction, some places that have acknowledged the possible health risks of construction dust for decades legally require the relevant contractor to adopt effective dust control measures, although inspections, fines and imprisonments are rare in recent years (for example, two prosecutions with a total fines of HK$6,000 in Hong Kong in the year 2021).

Some of the mandatory dust control measures include load, unload, handle, transfer, store or dispose of cement or dry pulverized fuel ash in a completely enclosed system or facility, and fit any vent or exhaust with an effective fabric filter or equivalent air pollution control system or equipment, enclose the scaffolding of the building with dust screens, use impervious sheeting to enclose both material hoist and debris chute, wet debris with water before it is dumped into a debris chute, have water sprayed on the facade surface before and during grinding work, use grinder equipped with vacuum cleaner for facade grinding work, spray water continuously on the surface for any pneumatic or power-driven drilling, cutting, polishing or other mechanical breaking operation that causes dust emission, unless there is the operation of an effective dust extraction and filtering device, provide hoarding of not less than 2.4 m in height along the whole length of the site boundary, have hard paving on open area and wash every vehicle that leaves the construction sites. Use of automatic sprinkler equipment, automatic carwash equipment and installation of video surveillance system for the pollution control facilities and retain the videos for one month for future inspections.

Besides removing particulates from the source of pollution, they may also be cleaned in the open air (e.g. smog tower, moss wall, and water truck), while other control measures employ the use of barriers.

== Regulation ==
Most governments have created regulations both for the emissions allowed from certain types of pollution sources (motor vehicles, industrial emissions etc.) and for the ambient concentration of particulates. Particulates are the deadliest form of air pollution due to their ability to penetrate deep into the lungs and blood stream, contributing to premature death from a wide variety of causes including respiratory diseases and cardiovascular diseases.

=== Limits / standards set by governments ===
Country/ Region	PM_{2.5} (μg/m^{3})		PM_{10} (μg/m^{3})		No. of exceedances allowed per year
Country/ Region	Yearly avg.	Daily avg. (24-hour)	Yearly avg.	Daily avg (24-hour)	No. of exceedances allowed per year
Australia	8	25	25	50	None
European Union	25	None	40	50	PM_{2.5}: None; PM_{10}: 35
Hong Kong	15	37.5	30	75	PM_{2.5}: 18; PM_{10}: 9
Japan (Note: PM_{10} referred to as Suspended Particulate Matter) (Note: PM_{2.5} limit since 21 September 2009)	15	35	None	100	None
South Korea (Note: PM_{10} limit since 4 December 2006) (Note: PM_{2.5} limit since 27 March 2018)	15	35	50	100	None
Taiwan	15	35	50	100	None
United Kingdom	20		40	50	35
United States	9 (Note: annual limit since 2024)	35 (Note: daily limit since 2007)	None (Note: annual limit removed in 2006)	150 (Note: daily limit since 1987)	PM_{2.5}: Not applicable; (Note: 3-year average of annual 98th percentile) PM_{10}: 1
World Health Organization	5	15	15	45	3–4

=== Canada ===
The Canadian Ambient Air Quality Standard (CAAQS) for particulate matter is set nationally by the federal-provincial Canadian Council of Ministers of the Environment (CCME). Jurisdictions (provinces and territories) may set more stringent standards.

As of 2020, the CCME standard for PM_{2.5} is 27 μg/m^{3} (calculated using the 3-year average of the annual 98th percentile of the daily 24-hr average concentrations) and 8.8 μg/m^{3} (3-year average of annual mean). Standards for ozone, nitrogen dioxide, and sulphur dioxide are also set.

In 2025, more stringent national standards were endorsed to take effect as of 2030. The 2030 CAAQS for PM_{2.5} are 23 μg/m^{3} (calculated using the 3-year average of the annual 98th percentile of the daily 24-hr average concentrations) and 8.0 μg/m^{3} (3-year average of annual mean).

=== China ===
Air pollution in China is a long-standing public health issue. In 2013, China introduced an Air Pollution Prevention and Control Action Plan to reduce pollution levels, which has led to improvements in air quality.

On February 24, 2026, China's Ministry of Ecology and Environment further updated its ambient air quality standards, to be implemented in two phases. During a transitional phase, from March 1, 2026 through December 31, 2030, the annual PM_{2.5} limit will be 30 μg/m^{3} and the PM_{10} limit will be 60 μg/m^{3}.

As of January 1, 2031, China's annual average limit for PM_{2.5} will become 25 μg/m^{3} and the annual average limit for PM_{10} will be reduced to 50 μg/m^{3}. In addition, the annual limits for sulfur dioxide will drop from 60 to 20 μg/m^{3}, and for nitrogen dioxide will drop from 40 to 30 μg/m^{3}.

=== European Union ===
The European Union has established air quality legislation through the passage of Ambient Air Quality Directives (AAQD), National Emission Ceilings Directives (NECD), and various source-specific directives. First introduced in 1980, AAQDs have defined limits for sulfur dioxide, particulate matter, lead, nitrogen dioxide, PM_{10} and PM_{2.5}. National Emission Ceilings Directives (NECD) and European emission standards for vehicles also limit sulphur dioxide (SO2), nitrogen oxides (NOx), non-methane volatile organic compounds (NMVOCs) and ammonia (NH3) as well as particulate matter in air.

European Air Quality Index	Good	Fair	Moderate	Poor	Very poor	Extremely poor
Particles less than 2.5μm (PM_{2,5})	0–10 μg/m^{3}	10–20 μg/m^{3}	20–25 μg/m^{3}	25–50 μg/m^{3}	50–75 μg/m^{3}	75–800 μg/m^{3}
Particles less than 10μm (PM_{10})	0–20 μg/m^{3}	20–40 μg/m^{3}	40–50 μg/m^{3}	50–100 μg/m^{3}	100–150 μg/m^{3}	150–1200 μg/m^{3}

Changes to EU standards have been passed and will be phased in beginning in 2026. The Euro 7 vehicle emissions standards will be phased in beginning 29 November 2026. They will cover petrol, diesel, and electric vehicles. Euro 7 will be the first standard to regulate sources of pollution such as dust from tires and brakes, not just exhaust fumes.

As of December 10, 2024, the European Union updated its Ambient Air Quality Directive (AAQD), giving EU member states until December 11, 2026 to implement the updated directive in their national laws and achieve interim targets, with stricter values to be attained by January 1, 2030.

European Air Quality Index	Target by December 11, 2026	Target by January 1, 2030
Particles less than 2.5μm (PM_{2.5}) Annual	25 μg/m^{3}	10 μg/m^{3}
Particles less than 10μm (PM_{10}) Annual	40 μg/m^{3}	20 μg/m^{3}
Particles less than 10μm (PM_{10}) Daily limit and allowed days	50 μg/m^{3} ≤ 35 days/year	45 μg/m^{3} ≤ 18 days/year
NO_{2} Annual	40 μg/m^{3}	20 μg/m^{3}

=== United Kingdom ===
The Clean Air Act of 1956 was a major act of the Parliament of the United Kingdom for UK pollution control policies. Enacted in response to 1952's Great Smog of London, it allowed local authorities to declare smoke control areas and laid the foundation for future pollution control measures.

To mitigate the problem of wood burning, starting from May 2021, traditional house coal (bituminous coal) and wet wood, two of the most polluting fuels, can no longer be sold. Wood sold in volumes of less than 2m^{3} must be certified as 'Ready to Burn', which means it has a moisture content of 20% or less. Manufactured solid fuels must also be certified as 'Ready to Burn' to ensure they meet sulfur and smoke emission limits. Starting from January 2022, all new wood burning stoves must meet new EcoDesign standards (Ecodesign stoves produce 450 times more toxic air pollution than gas central heating. Older stoves, which are now banned from sale, produce 3,700 times more).

As of 2023, the amount of smoke that burners in "smoke control areas" – most England's towns and cities – can emit per hour was reduced from 5g to 3g. Violations can result in an on-the-spot fine of up to £300 and a possible criminal record.

=== United States ===
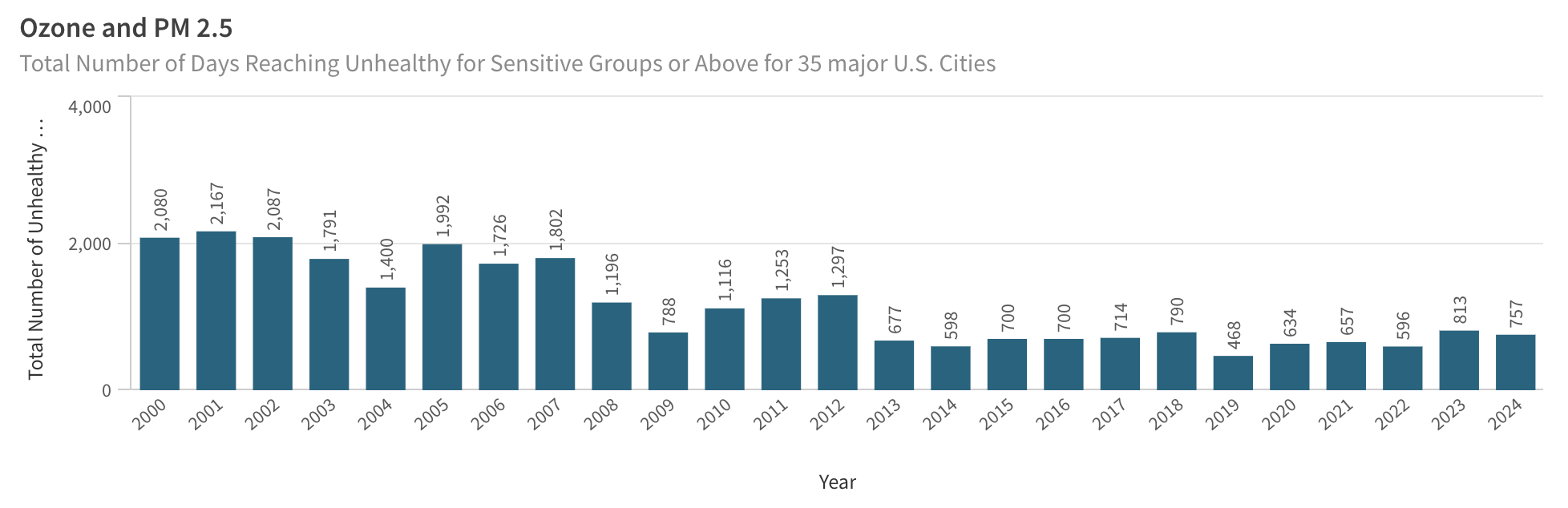
The number of days each year that ozone and PM2.5 exceeded US standards, 2000-2024

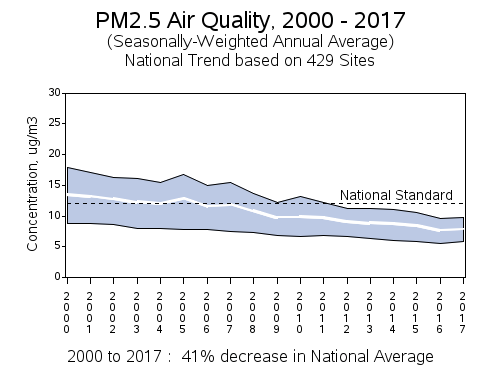
PM_{2.5} air quality trends in the United States, 2000-2017. Blue area shows the range of the middle 80% of monitoring sites.

As required by the Clean Air Act, the United States Environmental Protection Agency (EPA) sets National Ambient Air Quality Standards (NAAQS) for pollutants considered harmful to public health and the environment. The six criteria air pollutants are particulate matter (PM_{10} and PM_{2.5}), carbon monoxide, lead, ozone, nitrogen dioxide, and sulfur dioxide. Target levels are designated as either primary (protecting public health) or secondary (protecting "public welfare" due to harms against animals, crops, vegetation, buildings and decreased visibility). NAAQS for PM_{10} and PM_{2.5} are:

Pollutant	Type	Standard	Averaging Time	Exceedance Criteria	Regulatory Citation
Fine particulate matter (PM_{2.5})	Primary	9.0 μg/m^{3} (12 μg/m^{3} prior to May 6, 2024)	annual	Annual mean, averaged over 3 years	40 CFR 50.18
Fine particulate matter (PM_{2.5})	Secondary	15 μg/m^{3}	annual	Annual mean, averaged over 3 years	40 CFR 50.7
Fine particulate matter (PM_{2.5})	Primary and Secondary	35 μg/m^{3}	24-hour	98th percentile, averaged over 3 years	40 CFR 50.18
Particulate matter (PM_{10})	Primary and Secondary	150 μg/m^{3}	24-hour	Not to be exceeded more than once per year on average over 3 years	40 CFR 50.6

In addition, states, local agencies, and tribal governments can set stricter air quality standards. They are required to develop NAAQS-compliant plans to ensure that national standards are also being met.

==== California ====
The California Environmental Protection Agency and its department, the California Air Resources Board (CARB) have repeatedly taken action to set stricter ambient air quality standards. In some cases, such as PM_{10}, California ambient air quality standards (CAAQS) are more stringent than national standards. Regional initiatives such as the 2006 California Goods Movement Plan have been linked to improvements in air quality and health outcomes.

Country/ Region	PM_{2.5}		PM_{10}	
Country/ Region	Yearly avg.	Daily avg. (24-hour)	Yearly avg.	Daily avg (24-hour)
California Ambient Air Quality Standards	12 μg/m^{3}	NA	20 μg/m^{3}	50 μg/m^{3}

==== Colorado ====
Colorado generally follows National Ambient Air Quality Standards (NAAQS) for criteria air pollutants. Its State Implementation Plan (SIP) outlines the steps to be taken to enforce the NAAQS. Counties that exceed thresholds for criteria air pollutants are designated as "nonattainment areas". The Air Quality Control Commission (AQCC), appointed by the Governor and confirmed by the Senate, oversees Colorado's air quality program. The Air Pollution Control Division (APCD) of the Colorado Department of Public Health and Environment (CDPHE) monitors the air quality index (AQI) and reports daily air quality and health alerts. The Regional Air Quality Council (RAQC) has been the lead air quality planning agency for the metro Denver area since 1989.

The metro area of Denver, Colorado's capital, is of particular concern due to ozone and particulate pollution from industry, vehicles, power plants, refineries, and airports. Denver's location at the foot of the Rocky Mountains and local meteorological conditions tend to physically collect and hold pollutants. In the winter, cold air often settles in the valley with warmer air above it. Such temperature inversions trap particulate matter near the ground. Hot and dry conditions during the summer time put the area at risk for forest fires.

As of April 2026, the Colorado Air Quality Control Commission adopted new emission standards for five toxic air contaminants in addition to those covered by the NAAQS: Hydrogen sulfide, Benzene, Formaldehyde, Ethylene oxide, and Hexavalent chromium compounds.

== Particulate matter worldwide ==
=== PM_{2.5} by city ===
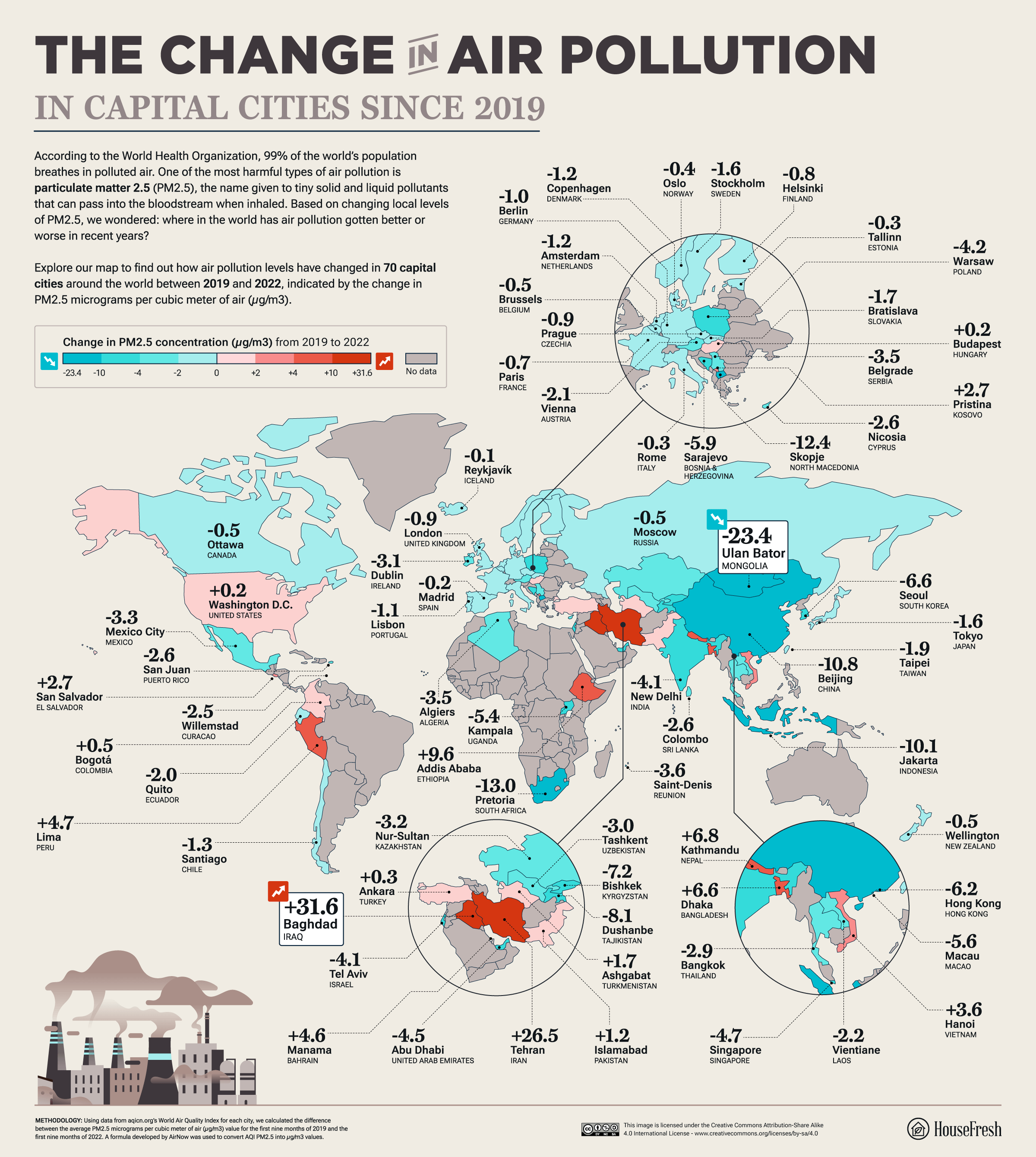
Difference between levels of PM_{2.5} in the air in 2019 and 2022 among 70 capital cities

To analyse the air pollution trend, 480 cities around the world (Ukraine excluded) was mapped by air experts to calculate the average PM_{2.5} level of the first nine months of 2019 against that of 2022. Average levels of PM_{2.5} were measured using aqicn.org's World Air Quality Index data, and a formula developed by AirNow was used to convert the PM_{2.5} figure into micrograms per cubic meter of air (μg/m^{3}) values.

Among the 70 capital cities investigated, Baghdad, Iraq is the worst performing one, with PM_{2.5} levels going up +31.6 μg/m^{3}. Ulan Bator (Ulaanbaatar), the capital city of Mongolia, is performing the best, with PM_{2.5} levels dropping by −23.4 μg/m^{3}. Previously it was as one of the most polluted capital cities in the world. An air quality improvement plan in 2017 appears to be showing positive results.

Out of the 480 cities, Dammam in Saudi Arabia is performing the worst with PM_{2.5} levels going up +111.1 μg/m^{3}. The city is a significant center for the Saudi oil industry and home to both the largest airport in the world and the largest port in the Persian Gulf. It is currently the most polluted city surveyed.

In Europe, the worst performing cities are located in Spain. They are Salamanca and Palma, with PM_{2.5} levels increase by +5.1 μg/m^{3} and +3.7 μg/m^{3} respectively. The best performing city is Skopje, the capital city of North Macedonia, with PM_{2.5} levels dropping by −12.4 μg/m^{3}. It was once the most polluted capital city in Europe and still has a long way to go to achieve clean air.

In the U.S., Salt Lake City, Utah and Miami, Florida are the two cities with the highest PM_{2.5} level increases (+1.8 μg/m^{3}). Salt Lake City suffers from a weather event known as 'inversion'. Located in a valley, cooler, polluted air is trapped close to ground level under the warmer air above when inversion occurs. On the other hand, Omaha, Nebraska is performing the best and has a decrease of −1.1 μg/m^{3} in PM_{2.5} levels.

The cleanest city in this report is Zürich, Switzerland with PM_{2.5} levels of just 0.5 μg/m^{3}, placed first in both 2019 and 2022. The second cleanest city is Perth, with 1.7 μg/m^{3} and PM_{2.5} levels dropping by −6.2 μg/m^{3} since 2019. Of the top ten cleanest cities, five are from Australia. They are Hobart, Wollongong, Launceston, Sydney and Perth. Honolulu is the only U.S. city in the top ten list, ranking tenth with levels of 4 μg/m^{3}, with a tiny increase since 2019.

Almost all of the top ten most polluted cities are in the Middle East and Asia. The worst is Dammam in Saudi Arabia with a PM_{2.5} level of 155 μg/m^{3}. Lahore in Pakistan is the second worst with 98.1 μg/m^{3}. The third is Dubai, home to the world's tallest building. In the bottom ten are three cities from India, Muzaffarnagar, Delhi and New Delhi. Here is a list of the 30 most polluted cities by PM_{2.5}, Jan to Sep 2022:

City	Country / Region	Months average PM_{2.5} (μg/m^{3})	
City	Country / Region	2022	2019
Dammam	Saudi Arabia	155	43.9
Lahore	Pakistan	98.1	64.6
Dubai	United Arab Emirates	97.7	47.5
Baghdad	Iraq	60.5	29
Dhaka	Bangladesh	55.3	48.7
Muzaffarnagar	India	53.9	60.5
Delhi	India	51.6	59.8
Oaxaca	Mexico	51.1	13.5
New Delhi	India	50.1	54.2
Manama	Bahrain	48	43.4
Patna	India	47.9	53.5
Peshawar	Pakistan	47	46.7
Ghāziābād	India	46.6	56.9
Lucknow	India	46.4	54.1
Hawalli	Kuwait	46.2	40.4
Hapur	India	45.7	53.3
Chandigarh	India	44.9	39.7
Jaipur	India	43.5	40.6
Kampala	Uganda	42.9	48.3
Khorramshahr	Iran	42	30
Pokhara	Nepal	41.8	18.2
Abu Dhabi	United Arab Emirates	40.2	44.7
Xi'an	China	36.6	40
Xuchang	China	36.4	41.4
Xinxiang	China	36.3	46.4
Anyang	China	36.1	45.9
Shijiazhuang	China	36	44.9
Taiyuan	China	35.9	39.2
East London	South Africa	35.9	7.1
Gandhinagar	India	35.5	42.9

There are limits to the above survey. For example, not every city in the world is covered, and that the number of monitoring stations for each city would not be the same. The data is for reference only.

=== Australia ===
PM_{10} pollution in coal mining areas in Australia such as the Latrobe Valley in Victoria and the Hunter Region in New South Wales significantly increased during 2004 to 2014, with the rate of increase rising each year from 2010 to 2014. According to National Pollutant Inventory data, PM_{10}, PM_{2.5}, metals and nitrogen oxide emissions increased alongside rising coal production between 2008 and 2018. Coal mines accounted for 42.1% of national PM_{10} emissions, of which 19.5% was PM_{2.5}.

Australia is also being affected by severe wildfires. The fire season of 2019–20 was known in Australia as Black Summer. Massive wildfires burned over 186,000 square kilometers of land, producing plumes of smoke and particulate matter. This increased concentrations of ice crystals, resulting in as much as 270% more lightning activity and 240% more rainfall in lightning storms over the Tasman Sea. Mineral dust and smoke particles from the fire emissions altered particulate composition on the surface of the ocean.

=== China ===
Air pollution in China has long been a public health issue, estimated to contribute to 1.67 million premature deaths nationally in 2020. Exposure to particulate matter is the nation's fourth leading risk factor for mortality. PM_{2.5} has been identified as the primary contributor to atmospheric particulate pollution in China.

Pollution levels in Chinese cities were extreme between 2010 and 2014. In 2011, in Beijing, a "Crazy Bad" air quality index (AQI) was reported that exceeded 500: 500 is the hypothetical maximum on the scale. On January 12, 2013, Beijing reported a "jaw-dropping" all-time high AQI of 755, the highest of 18 of 24 hourly readings that were "beyond index". This corresponded to a PM_{2.5} concentration of 886 μg/m^{3}, far beyond the WHO's then-recommended daily level of 25 μg/m^{3}.

In 2013, China introduced an Air Pollution Prevention and Control Action Plan to reduce pollution levels. Since then, air quality in China has shown substantial improvements thanks to clean air actions. From 2013 to 2017, annual average PM_{2.5} concentrations declined by 33.3% across 74 major Chinese cities. As of 2021, PM_{2.5} mass and toxicity had also decreased. Reductions in PM_{2.5} are associated with decreases in mortality rate. In Beijing, annual average concentrations of PM_{2.5} showed a decrease of 65.9% from 2013 to 2024. Beijing also set a record in 2024 with 290 days as the number of good/moderate air quality days since the beginning of monitoring.

=== Europe ===
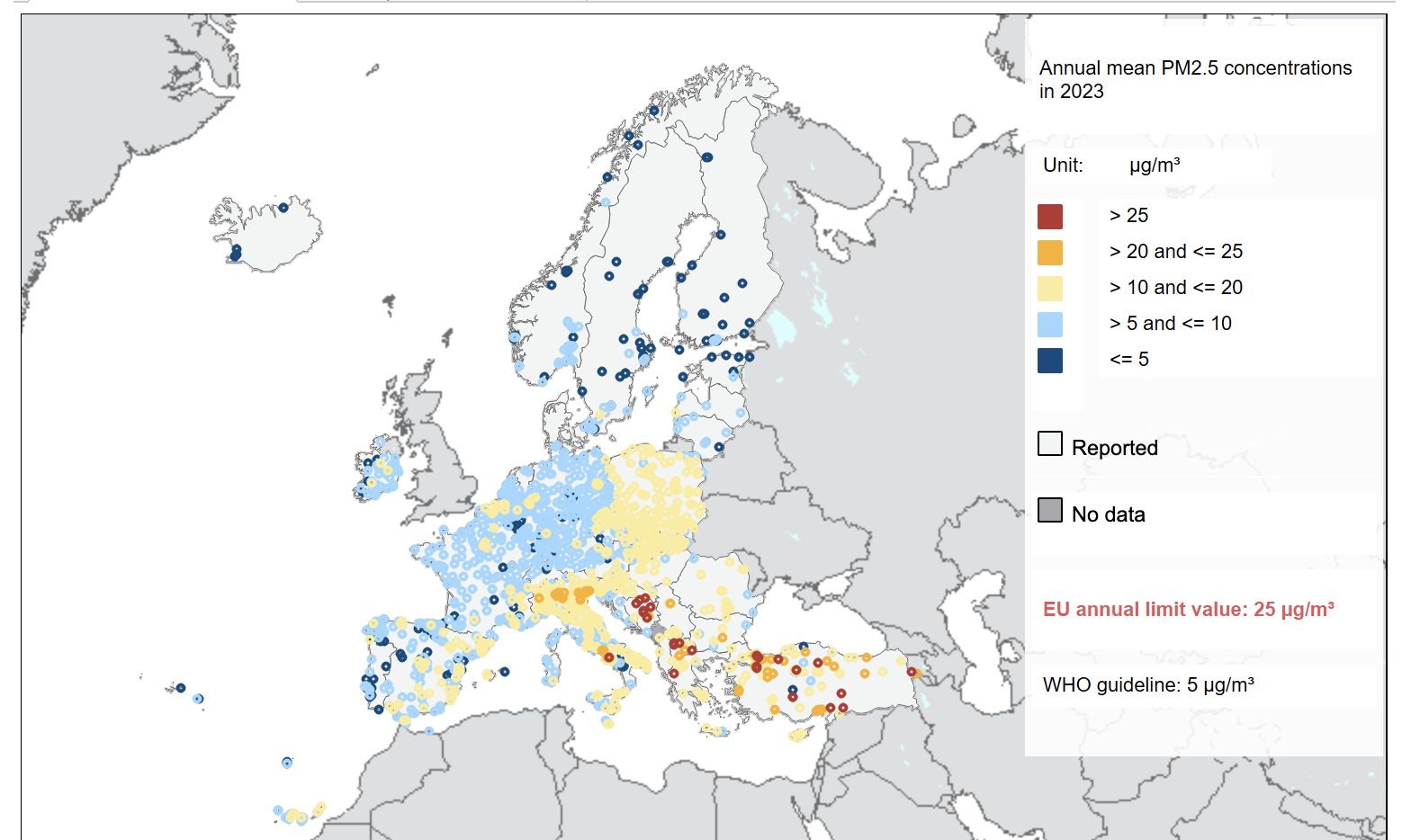
Map of annual mean PM2.5 concentrations in 2023, European Environment Agency

Europe continues to experience poor air quality. In 2021, the World Health Organization strengthened its guideline levels on annual PM_{2.5}, lowering its recommended guideline from 10 μg/m3 to 5 μg/m3. In 2023, the European Environment Agency (EEA) reported that while only 1.2% of its monitoring stations reported concentrations of PM_{2.5} above the EU annual limit value (25 μg/m3), 92% registered concentrations above the WHO annual guideline level (5 μg/m3).

Europe has a well-established air quality research infrastructure. Year-long datasets of organic aerosols (OA), a key component of total submicron particulate matter (PM_{1}), were collected from 2013 to 2019 from both non-urban and urban sites. Depending on location, between 20 and 90% of the mass of PM_{1} was attributed to organic aerosols (OA). It was possible to identify contributions from specific sources. For example, solid fuel combustion contributed 16% yearly, being lowest during the summer and rising to 24% during the winter months. Overall PM_{1} (including organic aerosols, black carbon, nitrate, sulfate, ammonium, and chloride) averaged 9.7 ± 7.9 μg/m3, and was generally higher at urban than non-urban sites. Among the patterns observed, urban sites showed characteristic morning and evening peaks due to rush-hour traffic. Both urban and rural sites showed reduced values during the day and a marked evening peak due to particulates from biomass burning for heating. The impact of traffic was lower on weekends, cooking was higher on evenings and weekends, and wood-burning (e.g. open fire grills and residential heating) was also higher on weekends.

=== South Korea ===
As of 2017, South Korea has the worst air pollution among the developed nations in the OECD (Organization for Economic Cooperation and Development). According to a study conducted by NASA and NIER, 52% of PM_{2.5} measured in Olympic Park, Seoul in May and June 2016 came from local emissions. The rest was trans-boundary pollution coming from China's Shandong Province (22%), North Korea (9%), Beijing (7%), Shanghai (5%), and a combined 5% from China's Liaoning Province, Japan and the West Sea. In December 2017, the environmental ministers from South Korea and China signed the China-Korea Environmental Cooperation Plan (2018–22), a five-year plan to jointly solve issues in the air, water, soil and waste. An environmental cooperation center was also launched in 2018 to aid cooperation.

=== Thailand ===
PM_{2.5} and PM_{10} pose serious health risks and are linked to high mortality rates in Thailand. They show seasonal variation: in urban areas of Thailand such as its capital, Bangkok, concentrations and PM_{2.5} exposure risk are higher during the cool dry season (December to February).

PM_{2.5} levels and associated health risks tend to be worse in northern areas such as Chiang Mai. The mountains that surround Chiang Mai interfere with air flow and cause temperature inversions that trap pollution. In 2023, Chiang Mai, a popular tourist destination, was ranked as the most polluted of 100 cities worldwide by a Swiss air quality company.

In March and April 2026, Chang Mai smog reached dangerous PM_{2.5} levels as a result of fires during the burning season (January through April), with dense haze and reduced visibility across the region. On March 30, 2026, PM_{2.5} levels were reported as 188 μg/m^{3}. Particulate matter levels in southern Thailand are also increasing as a result of open crop residue burning in Thailand and nearby Southeast Asian countries.

=== Mongolia ===
Mongolia's capital city Ulaanbaatar has an annual average mean temperature of about 0 °C, making it the world's coldest capital city. Ulaanbaatar is located in the Tuul River Valley, surrounded by the Khentii Mountains, conditions which tend to cause temperature inversions and trap air pollution. Temperature inversions are strongly correlated with particulate matter concentrations.

The use of coal and wood as fuels has been identified as a major source of air pollution. Heating mainly comes from coal. Coal is burned in power stations, heating the apartments of about 40% of the population, and in stoves in traditional Ger housing, home to the other 60% of the population. Ger districts or shantytowns have developed due to the country's new market economy and the severely cold winter seasons. The poor in these districts cook and heat their wood houses with indoor stoves fueled by wood or coal. The resulting air pollution is characterized by extremely high levels of particulate matter, carbon, sulfur dioxide, nitrogen oxide, iron, arsenic, lead, zinc, and nickel. Burning coal also produces fly ash, which contains fine dust particles in the PM_{2.5} size range.

Pollution in Ulaanbaatar is 4–11 times higher during the winter than other seasons, with primary emissions from combustion contributing prominently to winter air pollution. PM_{2.5} levels are elevated during the heating season, starting to rise in October and dropping by April. During peak heating season, November to February, hourly averaged PM_{2.5} concentrations can exceed 1000 μg/m^{3}, an extremely dangerous level. As of 2021, the World Health Organization's recommended annual mean PM_{10} limit is 15 μg/m^{3}. Winter air pollution in Ulaanbaatar has been linked to seasonal decreases in conception rates and birth outcomes, among other negative health outcomes.

Since 2010, rapid growth and uneven patterns of economic development have worsened poverty and air pollution. Mongolia has introduced a number of initiatives to improve availability of heating sources, fuels, and stoves. As of May 15, 2019, the Mongolian government introduced a ban on the burning of raw coal in Ulaanbaatar. Refined coal briquettes with lower emissions were subsidized as an alternative fuel, resulting in a reported 60% reduction in PM_{10} for the 2019-2020 winter.

=== United States ===
Following implementation of the Clean Air Act in 1970, air quality in the U.S. improved, with a reduction of 79% in combined emissions of criteria and precursor pollutants from 1970 to 2024. From 2000 to 2024, PM_{2.5} levels have decreased by 46% (Annual) and 45% (24-Hour), while PM_{10} has decreased by 36% (24-Hour).

Since 2018, wildfires have been a source of large amounts of particulate matter and ozone. In 2020, 1.7 million hectares burned in California. In 2023, wildfires in Canada contributed to large numbers of "smoke days" across the continental United States.

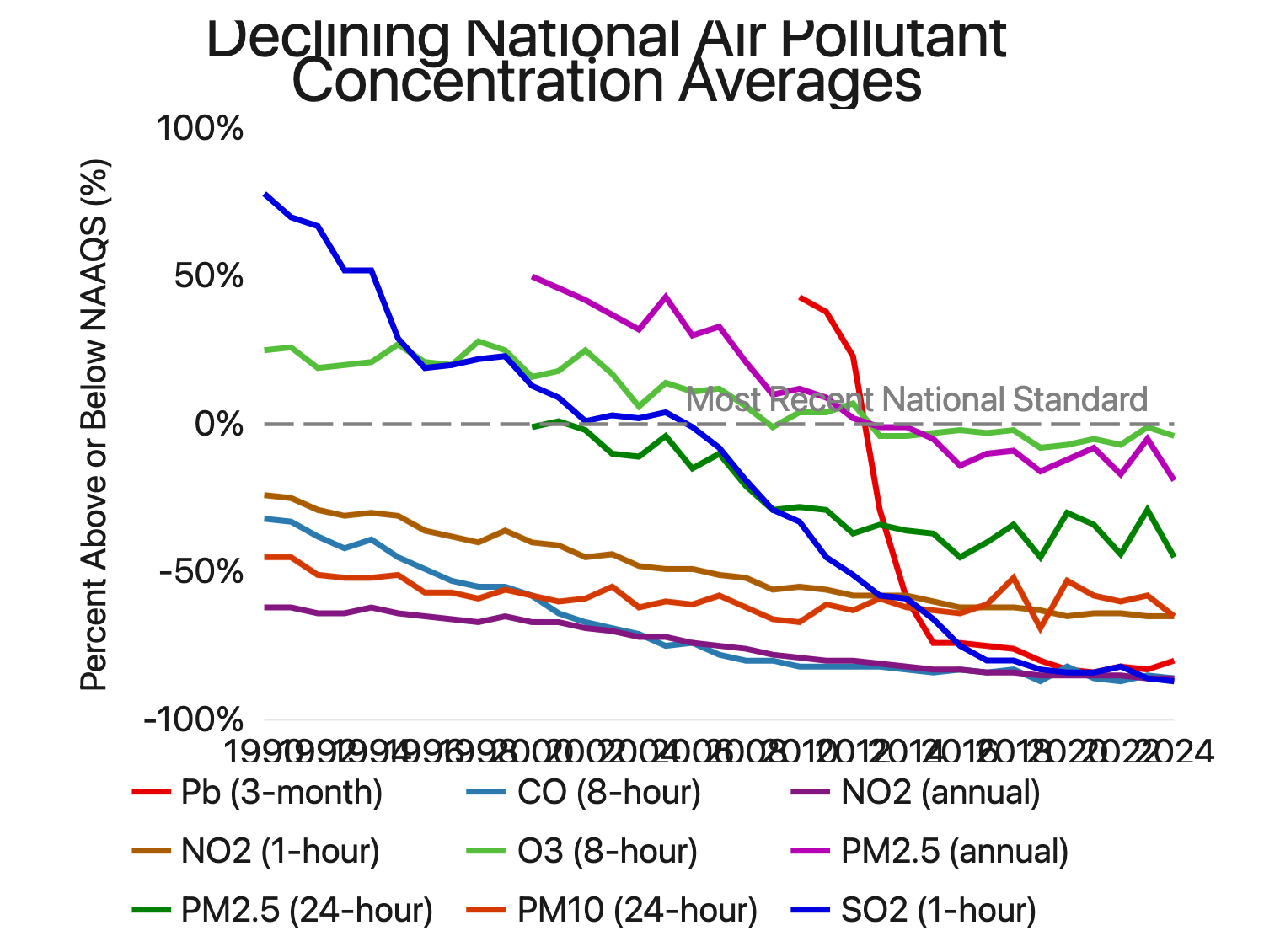
Declining National Air Pollutant Concentration Averages in the United States, 1990-2024

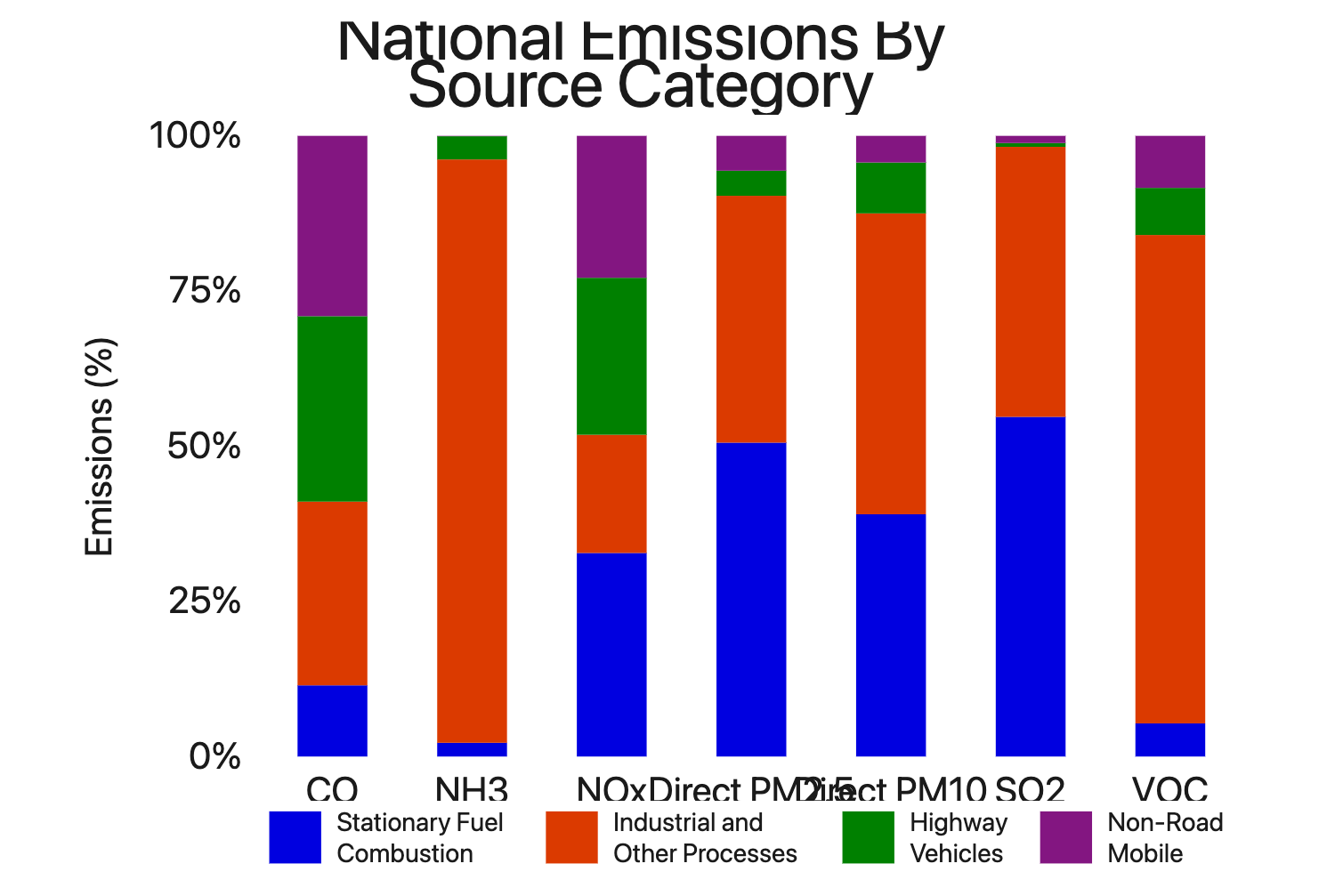
National Emissions of Pollutants By Source Category, United States, 2024

U.S. counties violating national PM_{2.5} standards, February 2026

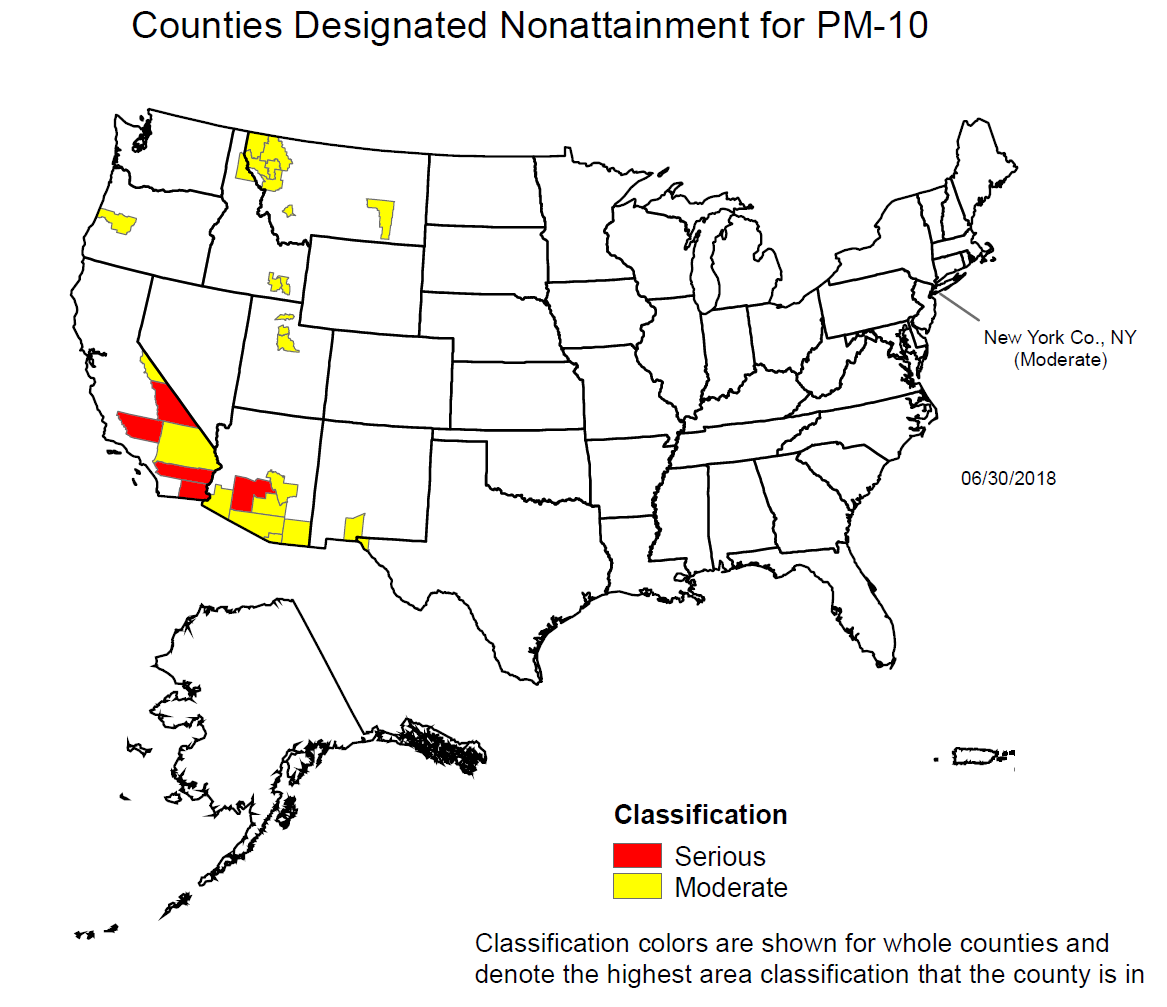
U.S. counties violating national PM_{10} standards, June 2018

== See also ==
- Air filter
- Air quality index | Air quality law
- ASTDR
- Bioaerosol
- Black carbon
- CCN (Cloud condensation nuclei)
- Chip formation
- Cleanroom
- Contamination control
- Criteria air contaminants
- Dust
- Exposure assessment | Exposure science
- Fertilizer | Pesticides
- Fog | Pea soup fog
- Fugitive dust
- Heavy industry
- List of least polluted cities by particulate matter concentration
- List of most polluted cities by particulate matter concentration
- Metal swarf | Sawdust
- NIEHS
- Non-exhaust emissions
- Occupational dust exposure
- Respirator
- Recycling
- Scrubber
- Suspended solids

Health effects:

- Health effects of coal ash
- Health effects of pesticides
- Health impact of asbestos
- Health impacts of sawdust

Health-related:

- Asthmagen
- Atherosclerosis
- Chronic obstructive pulmonary disease
- Exercise-induced bronchoconstriction
- Pneumoconiosis
- Pulmonary emphysema
- Pulmonary fibrosis
