= Particulate matter sampler =

A particulate matter sampler is an instrument for measuring particulates (solids and liquids) suspended in air. Particulate matter (PM) contains a mixture of solid particles and liquid droplets. It can include both inorganic materials (e.g. carbon, metals and other chemicals from dust, smoke, soot, sea salt, or sulfates) and organic materials (e.g. bioaerosols from microbial, fungal, animal, or plant sources).

Air quality is monitored worldwide at regulatory stations. Scientists, doctors, industries, and the public are interested in using low-cost particulate matter sensors to detect air quality locally and in real time. Some particulate matter samplers can continuously measure and report properties of particulates, while others collect samples for later analysis in a laboratory. Different types of PM samplers can measure particulate matter in terms of particle size, particle mass, particle number, particle size distribution, and particle surface area. Inertial separators may be used to eliminate particles outside of the size range that is desired to be measured.

== Measurement types ==
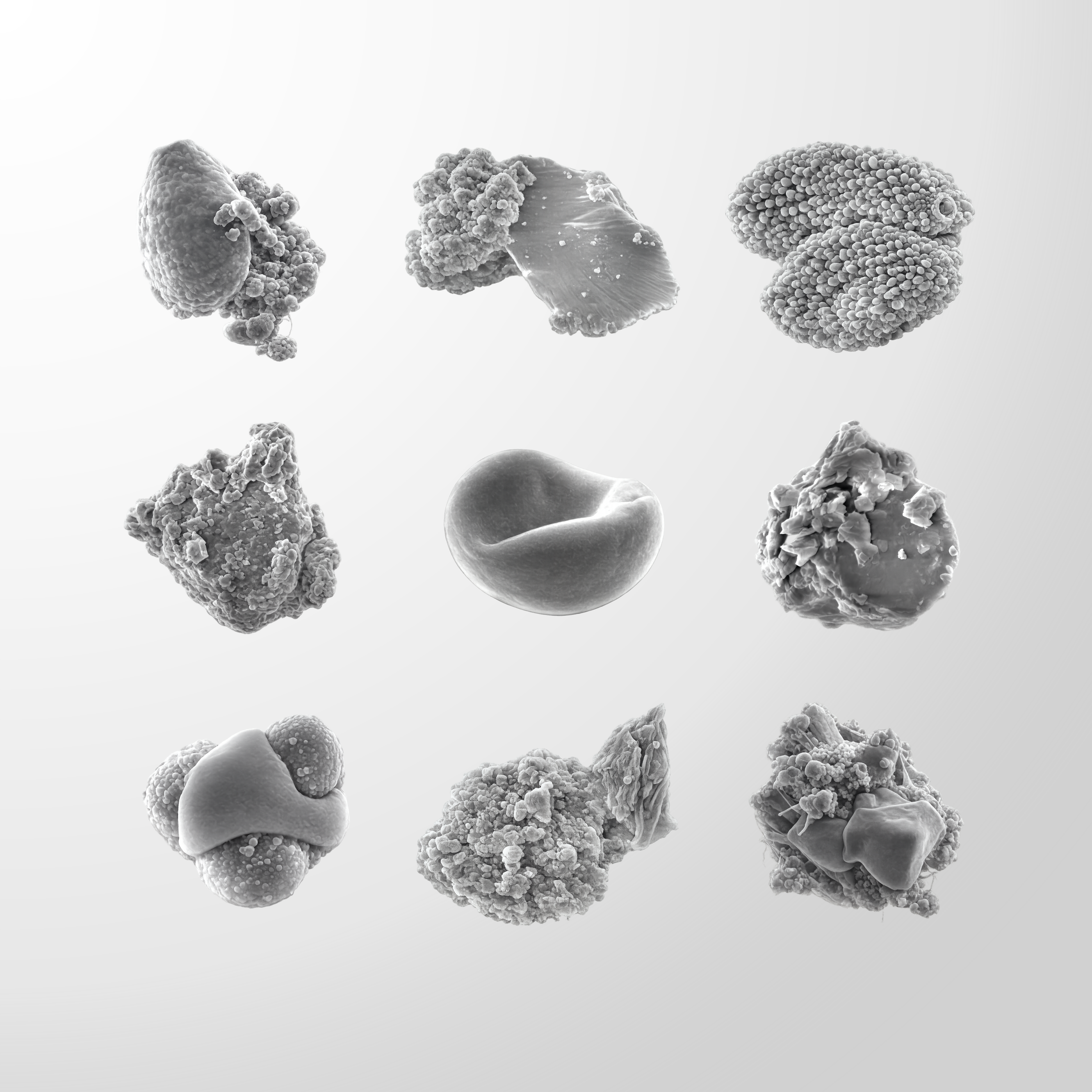
Micrographs of airborne particles

Airborne particulate matter (PM) is a complex mixture that can include small liquid droplets, dry solids, and liquid coatings around solid centers. Particles vary widely in size, shape and chemical composition. Each source has its own particular emission profile or signature in terms of particle size and chemical composition. The distribution of particles of different sizes within an air sample is important to understanding how particles will behave in the atmosphere and in the respiratory system.

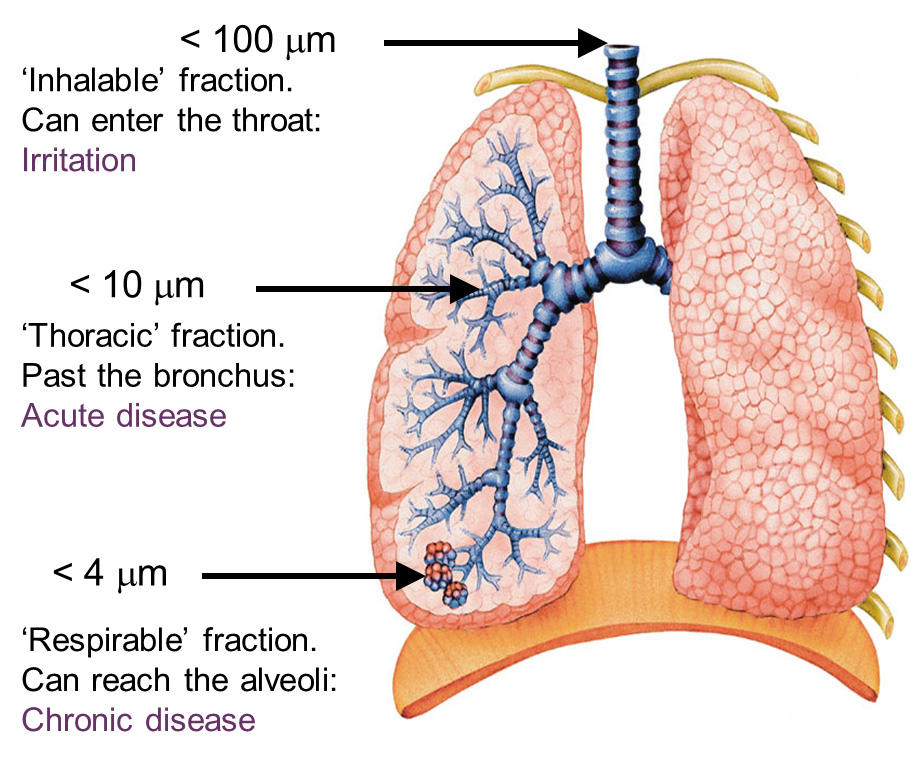
Penetration of airborne particulate matter into the lungs depends on size

For air quality regulation, measurements are often defined in terms of the maximum diameter of the particles being measured. Coarse particulates with a diameter of 10 microns or less (PM10) are of concern because they can be breathed into the lungs and cause harm. Fine particulate matter is smaller, with a diameter of 2.5 micrometers or less (PM2.5), and can penetrate farther into the lungs. The term ultrafine (UF) is sometimes used for the smallest particulates, less than 0.1 micrometers. The terms PM10 and PM2.5 define common cutoffs for particle size which are used when taking measurements. The numerical values reported for each category give the amount of particles in the size range being measured. Exposure standards for PM10 and PM 2.5 have been set by various countries. However, medical research suggests that no level of particulate exposure is safe.

Particulate mass concentration (PMC) is a key air quality indicator used to measure pollution levels and assess potential health risks. Particulate mass concentration is the total mass of particles present in a given volume of air. Such measurements typically describe particulate matter in terms of units of mass per volume, e.g. micrograms per cubic meter (μg/m^{3}). PMC is generally determined by filtering, sampling, and weighing particles collected from air. Filters may be designed to detect a particular size range (e.g. PM10 or PM2.5) or type of particulate. Measurements can be made using techniques such as gravimetric analysis, beta attenuation monitoring, and tapered element oscillating microbalances. Particulate mass concentration is often used in compliance monitoring for quality assurance, data collection for trend analysis, and high spatial resolution measurements. However, PMC methods may tend to ignore ultrafine particles, because total mass can be dominated by a small number of large particles.

In number-based measurements, the number of individual particles is counted, independent of their size or mass. Particle number concentration can be measured using condensation particle counters, light scattering methods (e.g. optical particle counters), and instruments based on diffusion chargers. Number concentration measurements can reveal important information about specific types of particles and their distribution over time. Number-based measurements may be particularly useful for identifying ultrafine particles. However, care must be taken to ensure that methods chosen are not biased towards detection of larger particles.

Diffusion chargers can be used to measure the active surface area of particles. Particle size distributions can be measured by using cascade impactors (e.g. gravimetric impactors), scanning mobility particle sizers, aerodynamic particle sizers, fast mobility particle sizers, and electrical low pressure impactors.

== Instrument types ==
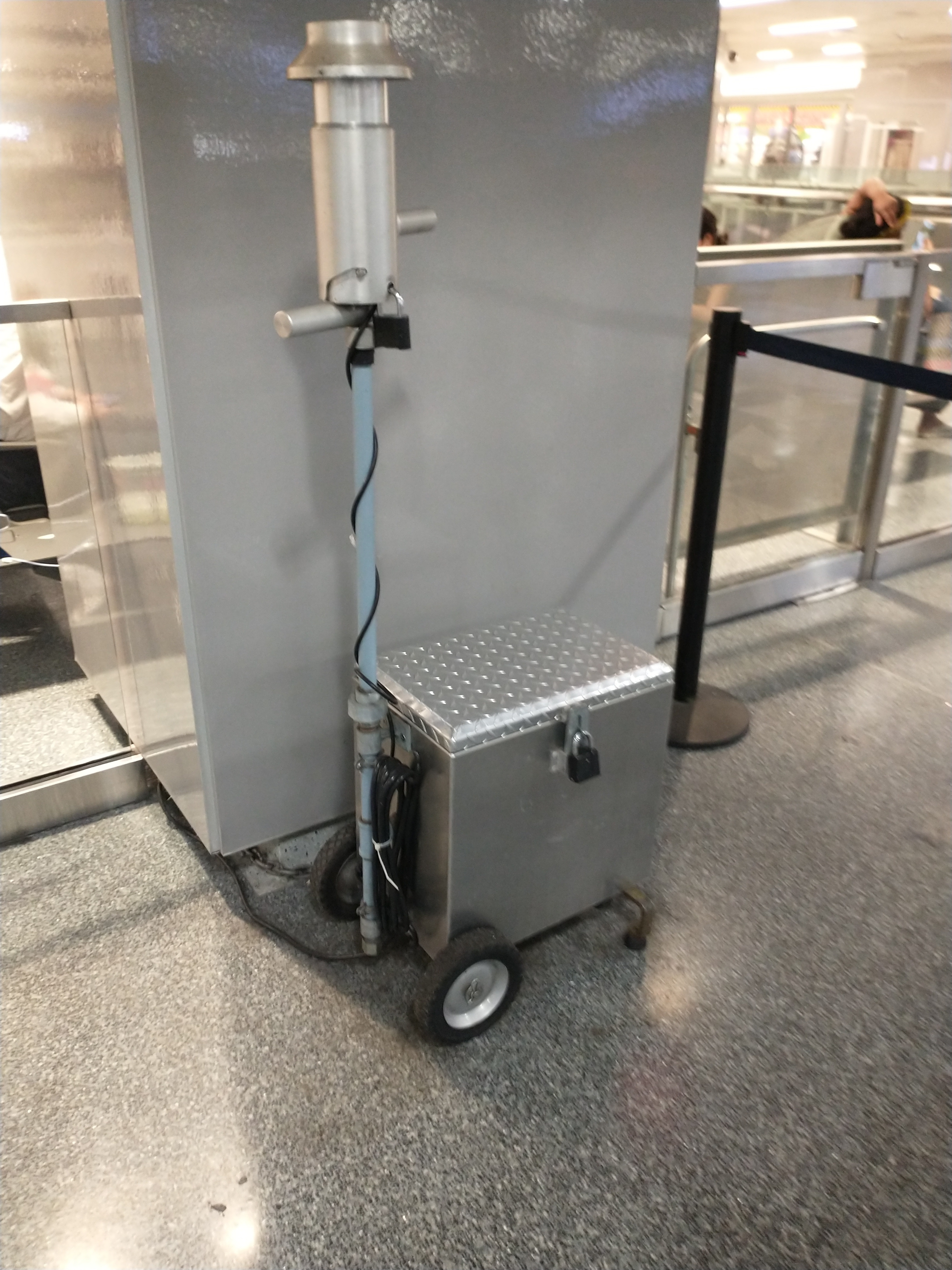
Air quality monitoring equipment at New York's Pennsylvania Station.

=== Particulate mass concentration (PMC) ===
==== Gravimetric mass determination ====
Gravimetric mass determination of particulate mass concentration is a two-stage process of collection and analysis. Sample collection uses standardized equipment to draw a known volume of air through a filter. The filter is weighed on an analytical balance before and after sampling. Collection may occur over a fixed time period such as 24 hours. The filter is brought back to a laboratory for analysis to determine the concentration of particulate material that it contains. The difference in weight divided by the volume of air pulled through the filter gives the mass concentration of the particulate.

For gravimetric air quality analysis, water that is combined with a contaminant is considered part of particulate matter. However, the definition of particulate matter does not include uncombined water, such as pure steam or water vapor. Uncombined water in a particulate sample should be removed, either by heating the sample to evaporate the water before the sample is weighed, or by placing the sample in a low humidity environment before weighing.

In the USA, the U.S. Environmental Protection Agency (EPA) sets standards for filter-based Federal Reference Methods (FRM) and continuous Federal Equivalency Methods (FEM) for air monitoring. Gravimetric filter-based PM_{2.5} FRM measurements are considered the gold standard for accuracy of measurement.

==== Beta Attenuation Monitor ====
Beta-ray absorption is compared before (D1) and after (D2) collection of an air sample on a tape to calculate particulate mass

The method of beta attenuation monitoring was introduced in the 1970s. When beta rays pass through a material, high-speed electrons (beta particles) strike against that material and lose energy. This reduction in intensity, or attenuation, can be measured. The more mass in a material, the more particles it will absorb. Given an air sample containing more particulate matter, more beta particles will lose energy and be absorbed.

A beta attenuation monitor (BAM) or beta gauge uses the technique of beta-ray absorption or attenuation to measure the mass of particulate matter. A reel to reel filter tape passes through a beta attenuation cell. Air is pulled through the filter tape for a certain period of time, e.g. 42-50 minutes, to collect an air sample. Beta-rays are directed at the tape before and after the air sample is taken to calculate mass. The before-and-after measurements are compared to determine the amount of particulate matter in the sample.

Electronic beta attenuation monitors can be used for measurement of particulate mass in the field. Although they can be used to make a series of measurements, such devices are stationary, bulky, and costly. Measurements can be affected by fluctuating environmental factors such as high relative humidity and particle composition. Therefore this method has lower accuracy than the gravimetric method, which measures mass directly.

==== Tapered element oscillating microbalance ====
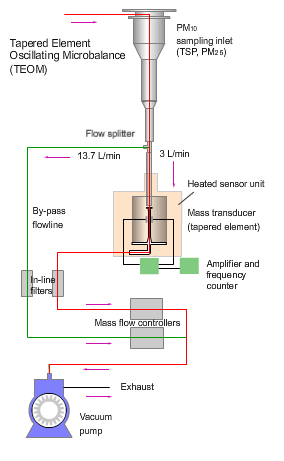
Schematic diagram of a tapered element oscillating microbalance (TEOM)

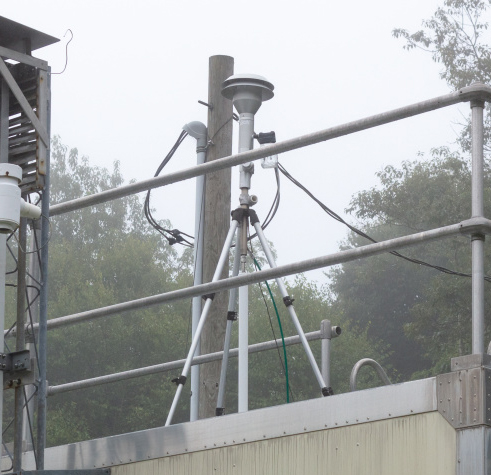
Real-time Particulate Matter Sensor (TEOM)

Tapered oscillating microbalances were introduced in the 1990s. A tapered element oscillating microbalance (TEOM) can be used for continuous, real-time detection of particulate matter by measuring mass concentration. However, like BAMs, TEOMs are stationary, bulky, and costly.

A TEOM filter cartridge is mounted on the tip of a hollow glass tube, which is free to vibrate as air is drawn through it. An electrical circuit causes the tube to vibrate. As particulate matter from the air collects on this filter, the tube's frequency of oscillation decreases. The resonant frequency of the tube, or rate at which it vibrates, is inversely proportional to the square root of the mass that collects on the filter. The change in frequency is used to calculate the particle mass. A filter dynamic measurement system (FDMS) can be used to ensure that the filter is periodically cycled and reset to its natural frequency. Factors such as mechanical noise and temperature fluctuations can interfere with the sensor's vibrations and affect the accuracy of its results.

==== Noise based particulate estimation ====
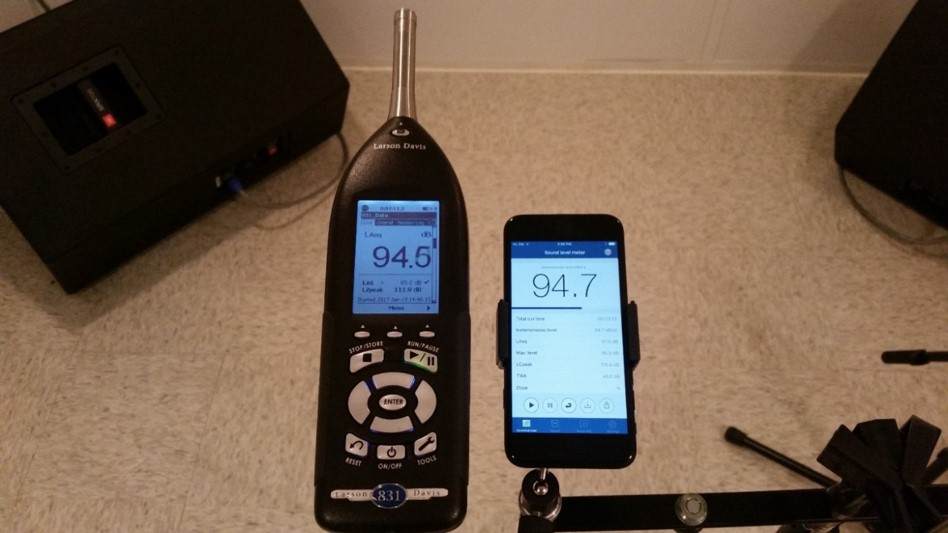
A sound meter (left) and a smartphone app

Urban traffic is a major source of pollution. Microphone based instruments have been used to monitor noise levels and predict traffic-related particle number concentration (PNC) near roadways. Specific frequency bands (e.g., 40 Hz, 500 Hz, 800 Hz) are associated with the operation of different engines and fuels. Computer systems can be trained to identify patterns in noise and predict pollutant concentrations based on training data. Devices such as sound meters and smartphones, which are small and portable, can then be used to predict particulate levels based on the computer's model. Conditions such as wind, humidity, building characteristics, and specific traffic conditions, can influence both the model and predicted results.

=== Particle number concentration ===
==== Optical particle counters ====
An optical particulate counter sends a beam of light through an air sample and measures light scattering.

Optical particle counters (OPCs) use light scattering to measure particulate matter by shining a beam of light through an air sample. Types of light sources include focused incandescent lamps, lasers and infrared light emitting diodes (IR LEDs). OPCs were introduced in the 1940s and became increasingly used following the invention of lasers in the 1960s. Lasers, which have a more intense light than IR LEDs, can be used to classify both the number and size of particles.

Optical particle counters contain a light source, an intake system to draw in air, an area where a light beam is projected through the air sample, and photodetection sensors to measure the scattered light. A light beam is scattered as it hits individual particulates, changing the intensity, angle, and pattern of the light. Scattering can be precisely described according to Mie theory. The rate of detection can be used to count the number of particulates present, while the intensity of the scattered light can indicate particulate size.

Based on a priori assumptions about particle size and distribution, optical particle counters can be used to estimate mass concentration. Particulates can be classified by size, and algorithms can be used to estimate mass based on the numbers of sizes of particulates present. Proper calibration is essential to ensure that the conditions that are assumed actually apply. Some optical particle counters can perform real-time particulate matter measurements comparable to the precision and accuracy of an FEM instrument.

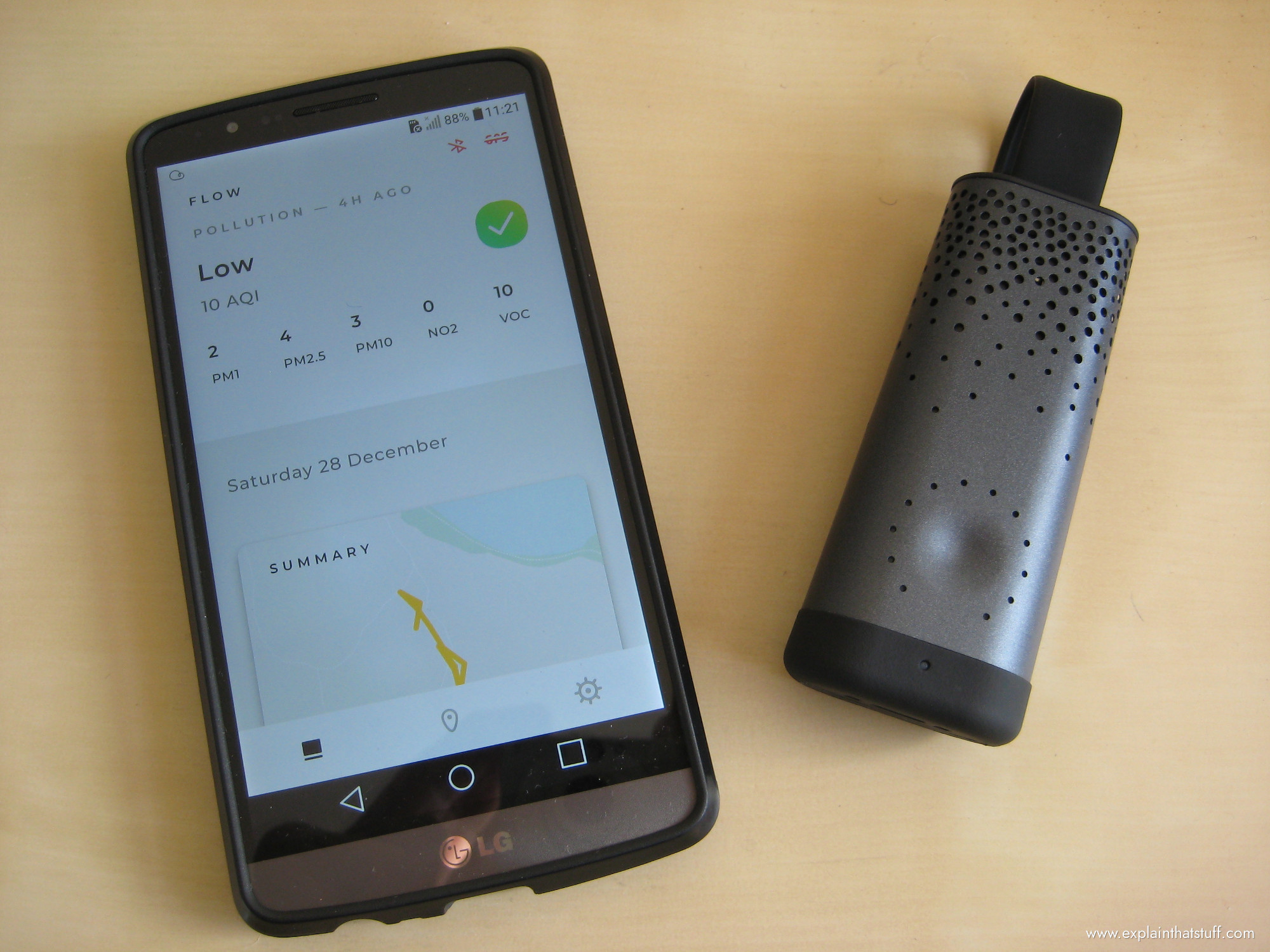
Plume Flow 2 sensor (right), which uses light scattering, and smart phone app

Low-cost particulate matter sensors (LCPMS) are miniaturized and simplified OPCs. While LCPMS still use light scattering techniques, they tend to be less accurate. Their advantages are that they are generally cheaper, smaller, portable, and can be used for real-time measurements. LCPMS are used in equipment such as air purifiers, IoT devices and handheld air quality monitoring devices. LCPMS generally require calibration and are highly vulnerable to external factors such as temperature and humidity.

==== Condensation particle counters ====
In a CPC, particles are saturated to a detectable size before being optically measured

A condensation particle counter (CPC) or condensation nucleus counter (CNC) is a modified optical particle counter. It extends the range of the OPC, enabling it to detect and count much smaller particles. Ultrafine particles are passed through a vapor so that larger droplets will condense around the small particle. The larger droplets can then be detected. With conventional optical techniques, particles below 50 nm are generally undetectable. Depending on the vapor and condensation technique used, CPCs are able to detect particles as small as 2 nm. The minimum detectable particle size of a CPC is commonly defined as the diameter at which the CPC detects 50% of the particles.

Condensation particle counters are used for the measurement of both laboratory and on-road vehicle emissions. Limits for vehicle exhaust particle number (PN) concentrations have been set as part of the European Union's standards for light-duty vehicle emissions. To measure vehicle PN, condensation particle counters with a counting efficiency (CE) of 50% at 23 nm are required. CPCs are also used in some workplaces to assess occupational safety. Care must be taken to ensure that environmental measurements will not exceed the range of the CPC.

=== Particle surface monitors ===
==== Diffusion chargers ====
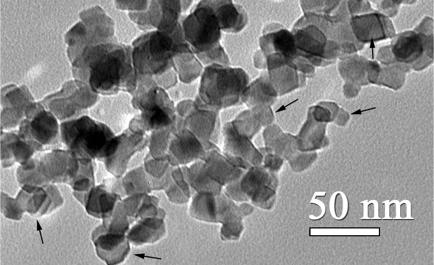
Nanoparticles can have non-spherical shapes with differing surface areas (e.g. Titanium dioxide)

Different types of particulates can have non-spherical shapes and differing surface areas. Studies of particles within the human respiratory tract, from the 1980-90's, have shown that surface area and aerodynamic diameter of particles are related to the probability that a particle will remain within the respiratory system and cause harm.

Diffusion chargers (DCs) are direct-reading instruments that use corona discharge from an electrode to measure the active surface area of particles. Diffusion chargers measure particulate matter (PM) by using an electrical current to generate a corona discharge. A current flows from an electrode with a high potential into a neutral surrounding area, such as air, and generates ions that can diffuse to particles in the airstream. Once free ions are removed from the system, the amount of charge that transferred to the remaining particles is measured. The resulting electrical current correlates with the active surface area of the particles. Diffusion chargers can be used alone as particle surface monitors or with other instruments to examine additional particle properties.

Diffusion chargers are especially effective for detecting nanoparticles, typically in the 10–300 nm range, and measuring lung-deposited surface area (LDSA). DCs can measure higher particle concentrations than CPCs. Diffusion chargers do not use working fluids and can operate at higher temperatures.

=== Particle separators ===
Particles of different sizes have different health effects. Particle separators are used to collect particles within a specific size range. This can be particularly useful when examining fine particles and size-specific types of bioaerosols. Particle samplers can use a variety of collection mechanisms including solid plate impaction, centrifugal impaction, filtration, and liquid impingement.

Inertial impactors operate using a technique called solid plate impaction. A stream of air containing particles of different sizes is directed along a tube towards a greased metal plate. The tube contains a sharp corner that causes the air stream to exit away from the plate. Because of inertia, larger particles will continue moving in a straight line and hit the plate, separating them from the smaller particles which continue through the turn as part of the air stream. Horizontal air velocity has a significant effect on separation, as does gravity. An air flow control system may be used to send air through the particle separator at the velocity required to separate particles into desired sizes. Particles can then be collected and removed. Inertial impactors are widely used for bioaerosol sampling.

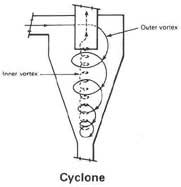
A Cyclone for dust separation

Cyclone separators use centrifugal impaction, spinning the gas stream to cause collisions of heavier particles around the cyclone wall. Cyclones are often used as pre-samplers to selectively remove large particles. Multiple stages can be linked together to collect different sizes of particles, but this risks transport loss during collection.

Filtration mechanisms collect aerosols based on interception, inertial impaction, diffusion, gravity, and electrostatic attraction. Filtration can be applied and specialized to a broad range of particle sizes, and is often used for bioaerosol sampling of particles smaller than 1 μm. Samplers that use filtration often can be designed in small sizes.

Liquid impingement directly collects aerosols in a collection fluid. It has a high retention efficiency but results can be affected by evaporation of the collection fluid over time. This technique is generally not appropriate for high-volume sampling.

== Uses ==
Particulate matter (PM) samplers are used to assess the presence and characteristics of particulate matter in a wide variety of environments. This information can be used in various ways.

=== Air Pollution Monitoring and Assessment ===
- Determining mass concentration: Filter samples are weighed to assess overall particle pollution levels.
- Evaluating compliance with air quality standards: Regulatory bodies like the EPA use PM samples to monitor air quality and ensure compliance with established standards for particle sizes (e.g., PM_{2.5}, PM_{10}).
- Assessing source contributions: Chemical analysis of PM samples helps identify the sources of pollution, such as industrial activities, traffic, biomass burning, and natural sources like wildfires and dust storms.
- Real-time monitoring: Instruments like tapered element oscillating microbalances (TEOM) and beta attenuation monitors (BAM) provide continuous, real-time measurements of PM mass concentration.

=== Health Research and Risk Assessment ===
- Evaluating health impacts: PM samples are used in epidemiological studies to understand the relationship between exposure to different PM types and health problems such as respiratory and cardiovascular diseases.
- Studying biological effects: Researchers collect PM samples in toxicological laboratory experiments to investigate how specific contaminants affect cells and tissues.
- Risk assessment: Comparing laboratory data with real-world exposure scenarios helps assess the potential health risks associated with PM.

=== Atmospheric Research and Climate Studies ===
- Characterizing atmospheric conditions: PM samples help to understand atmospheric processes, air quality, and global climate change.
- Tracing atmospheric processes: Isotope compositions and radionuclides like 210Pb in PM samples can be used as tracers to study atmospheric transport and residence times.

=== Industrial Applications ===
- Monitoring industrial emissions: Industrial air samplers collect PM samples to identify and quantify pollutants, ensuring compliance with environmental regulations and assessing the effectiveness of dust collection systems such as baghouses, electrostatic precipitators, inertial separators, and wet scrubbers.
- Product quality control: Particulate matter testing in manufacturing processes helps determine the cleanliness and stability of solutions in pharmaceutical products.

=== Identifying and Characterizing Contamination ===
- Investigating indoor air quality: PM samples help identify the sources of indoor air pollution, including allergens, and guide strategies to improve indoor air quality.
- Analyzing contaminants in materials: Techniques like microscopy are used to identify and characterize particulate contaminants in various materials including pharmaceuticals, to determine their size, shape, and chemical composition.

== See also ==
- Air pollution measurement
- Occupational hygiene
- Particle counter
