= Gas phase electrophoretic molecular mobility analysis =

Gas-phase electrophoretic mobility molecular analysis (GEMMA) is a (bio-)chemical analysis method in which nanoflow electrospray ionization creates aerosols of macromolecules and (bio-)nanoparticles dissolved in volatile electrolyte solutions via e.g. cone-tipped capillaries prepared in-house. Obtained droplets are dried in a flow of ambient air and CO_{2}. Concomitantly, charge-equilibration in a bipolar atmosphere induced e.g. by a soft X-Ray charger, a bipolar corona discharge process or an alpha-particle emitter like ^{210}Po occurs. Subsequently, a majority of analytes is neutral and no longer regarded, some particles carry a single charge and are further analyzed and a minority of molecules is doubly- to multiply-charged and can be disregarded.

Surface-dried, singly-charged analytes are separated in a differential mobility analyzer (DMA), according to their size equivalent (electrophoretic mobility, EM, diameter or EMD) in a high laminar sheath flow of filtered, ambient air and a tunable electric field applied in a perpendicular direction. By variation of the field strength, monomobile particle fractions are obtained from the originally polydisperse aerosol. Particle numbers per fraction are assessed, e.g. via a condensation particle counter (CPC), resulting in particle number values per EM diameter (giving a spectrum) in good accordance with recommendations of the European Commission for nanoparticle characterization. The method is also known as nES DMA (predominantly US region), nES GEMMA (predominantly Europe), MacroIMS (company name), SMPS (company name) or LiquiScan ES (company name).

Gas-phase electrophoresis has been applied in the characterization of various (bio-)nanoparticle materials, e.g.:

- Viruses and virus-like particles (VLPs), e.g.
- Liposomes
- Extracellular vesicles
- Lipoproteins
- Proteins and protein aggregates
- DNA and protein/DNA complexes
- Polymers
- Polysaccharides
- Inorganic nanoparticles, e.g. silver, silica or gold-based
- Organic nanoparticles, e.g. gelatin based

Alternatively, by keeping the voltage of the DMA constant, particles of a certain EM diameter can be collected on sample support materials for further characterization via orthogonal analytical methods, e.g. mass spectrometry, atomic force microscopy, spectroscopy, electron microscopy, or dot-blot analysis.

By application of a correlation between the molecular weight and the EM diameter it is possible to assess the molecular weight of an analyte based on its EM diameter.

Via consequent particle number calibrations also analyte concentrations can be obtained from nES GEMMA measurements.

== See also ==
- Ion-mobility spectrometry–mass spectrometry
- Differential mobility detector
- Particle mass analyser
- Electrical mobility
- Electrical aerosol spectrometer
