= Aerodynamic aerosol classifier =

An aerodynamic aerosol classifier (AAC) is an embodiment of a measurement technique for classifying aerosol particles according to their aerodynamic diameters.

The technique allows online size classification of particles without requiring them to be electrically charged, and advantageously allows selection of particles within a narrow range of aerodynamic diameters. This is by contrast to an impactor or virtual impactor, which allow only particles smaller than, or larger than, a certain cut-point, respectively. A practically implementable AAC can classify particles from the nanometre range to a few microns in size.

This removes many of the difficulties associated with multiple charging artifacts, such as may be encountered when classifying particles by size according to electrical mobility (such as the differential mobility analyser or DMA). The selection of particles by aerodynamic diameter also lends itself to respiratory and inhalation applications as this metric directly affects lung deposition.

The technique is described by Olfert et al.

== Scanning aerodynamic size spectrometer ==
A scanning aerodynamic size spectrometer (SASS) uses a condensation particle counter (CPC) downstream of an AAC to measure high resolution aerodynamic particle size distributions (APSD). The AAC's rotational speed is ramped up or down, continuously changing the size of particle passed, whist the CPC counts the particles. An inversion algorithm takes into account the particle residence timings in the classifier and in the CPC to produce the final size distribution. The technique is similar in principle to the scanning mobility particle sizer (SMPS), which instead produces an electrical mobility size spectrum, although the SASS inversion does not need to take account of particle charge state. The SASS was first described by Johnson et al.
