= Particle counter =

Device for monitoring particle contamination

A particle counter is used for monitoring and diagnosing particle contamination within specific clean media, including air, water, and chemicals. Particle counters are used to support clean manufacturing practices in a variety of industrial applications. Clean manufacturing is required for the production of many electronic components and assemblies, pharmaceutical drug products and medical devices, and industrial technologies such as oil and gas.

== Technology ==
Diagram of a particle counter

Particle counters function primarily using the principles of light scattering, although other technologies may also be employed. Light scattering by particles use instrumentation comprising a high-intensity light source (a laser), a controlled media flow (air, gas or liquid) and highly sensitive light-gathering detectors (a photo detector).

Laser optical particle counters employ five major systems:

1. Lasers and optics: A laser operates on a single wavelength, so the light source is consistent with constant power output to illuminate the particle sampling region.
2. Controlled flow: The viewing volume is a small chamber illuminated by the laser. The sample medium (air, liquid or gas) is drawn into the viewing volume, the laser passes through the medium, the particles scatter (reflect) light, and a photodetector tallies the scattered light sources (the particles).
3. Photodetector: The photodetector is an electric device that is sensitive to light, and when particles scatter light, the photodetector observes the flash of light and converts it to an electric signal, or pulse. An amplifier converts the pulses to a proportional control voltage.
4. Pulse height analyzer (PHA): The pulses from the photodetector are sent to a pulse height analyzer (PHA). The PHA examines the magnitude of the pulse and places its value into an appropriate sizing channel, called a bin. The bins contain data about each pulse, and this data correlates to particle sizes.
5. Black box: The black box, or support circuitry, looks at the number of pulses in each bin and converts the information into particle data.

Light obscuration by particles works on the principle where the presence of particles blocks some of the light from the photodetector, typically through either absorbance or light scattering. The photodetector records the obscuration of light and converts this to an electrical signal, this signal is then correlated to a specific sized particle using a PHA as with the scattering description above.

Direct imaging particle counting employs the use of a high-resolution camera and a light source to detect particles. Vision based particle sizing units obtain two dimensional images that are analyzed by computer software to obtain particle size measurement, images can be retained and replayed for additional analysis

A Coulter counter is an apparatus for counting and sizing particles suspended in electrolytes. It is typically used for cellular particles. The Coulter principle, and the Coulter counter that is based on it, is the commercial term for the technique known as resistive pulse sensing or electrical zone sensing.

=== Detection methods ===
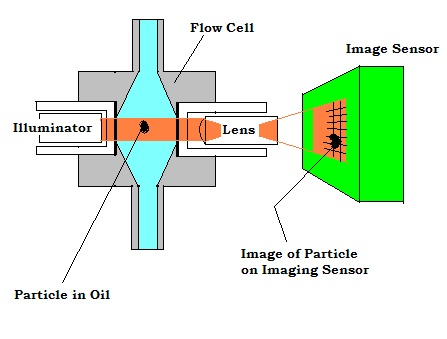
Diagram of a vision-based particle counter

There are several methods used for detecting and measuring particle size or size distribution — light blocking (obscuration), light scattering, Coulter principle and direct imaging. A high intensity light source is used to illuminate the particle as it passes through the detection chamber.

The light blocking optical particle counter method is typically useful for detecting and sizing particles greater than 1 micrometre in size and is based upon the amount of light a particle blocks when passing through the detection area of the particle counter. This type of technique allows high resolution and reliable measurement.

If light scattering is used, then the redirected light is detected by a photo detector. The light scattering method is capable of detecting smaller-sized particles. This technique is based upon the amount of light that is deflected by a particle passing through the detection area of the particle counter. This deflection is called light scattering. Typical detection sensitivity of the light scattering method is 0.05 micrometre or larger. However, employment of the condensation nuclei counter (CNC) technique would allow a higher detection sensitivity in particle sizes down to nanometre range. A typical application is monitoring of ultrapure water in semiconductor fabrication facilities.

If light blocking (obscuration) is used the loss of light is detected. The amplitude of the light scattered or light blocked is measured and the particle is counted and tabulated into standardized counting bins. The light blocking method is specified for particle counters that are used for counting in hydraulic and lubricating fluids. Particle counters are used here to measure contamination of hydraulic oil, and therefore allow the user to maintain their hydraulic system, reduce breakdowns, schedule maintenance during no or slow work periods, monitor filter performance, etc. Particle counters used for this purpose typically use ISO Standard 4406:1999 as their reporting standard, and ISO 11171 as the calibration standard. Others also in use are NAS 1638 and its successor SAE AS4059D.

If direct imaging is used, a halogen light illuminates particles from the back within a cell while a high definition, high magnification camera records passing particles. Recorded video is then analyzed by computer software to measure particle attributes. Direct imaging particle counting employs the use of a high resolution camera and a light to detect particles. Vision based particle sizing units obtain two dimensional images that are analyzed by computer software to obtain particle size measurement in both the laboratory and online. Along with particle size, color and shape analysis can also be determined. Direct imaging is a technique that uses the light emitted by a laser as a source to illuminate a cell where particles are passing through. The technique does not measure the light blocked by the particles, but rather measures the area of the particles functioning like an automated microscope. A pulsed laser diode freezes the particle motion. The light transmitted through the fluid is imaged onto an electronic camera with macro focusing optics. The particles in the sample will block the light, and the resulting silhouettes will be imaged onto the digital camera chip.

== Matrices ==
Applications of particle counters are separated into three primary categories:

- Aerosol particle counters
- Liquid particle counters
- Solid particle counters

=== Aerosol particle counters ===
A video about measuring contaminants in the air at a workplace as part of a NIOSH Health Hazard Evaluation Program investigation

Aerosol particle counters are used to determine the air quality by counting and sizing the number of particles in the air. This information is useful in determining the quantity of particles inside a building or in the ambient air. It also is useful in understanding the cleanliness level in a controlled environment. A common controlled environment aerosol particle counters are used in is a cleanroom. Cleanrooms are used extensively in semiconductor device fabrication, biotechnology, pharmaceuticals, disk drives, aerospace and other fields that are very sensitive to environmental contamination. Cleanrooms have defined particle count limits. Aerosol particle counters are used to test and classify a cleanroom to ensure its performance is up to a specific cleanroom classification standard. Several standards exist for cleanroom classification. The most frequently referred to classification is from the United States. Though originating in the United States, the standard Federal Standard 209E was the first and most commonly referred to. This standard was replaced in 1999 by an international standard, but Federal Standard 209E remains today the most widely referenced standard in the world.

There are several direct-reading instruments for measuring aerosol particle emissions. The CPC and differential mobility particle sizers, including the scanning mobility particle sizer and fast mobility particle sizer, can measure aerosol concentration; the diffusion charger and electric low pressure impactor can measure surface area; the size selective static sampler and tapered element oscillating microbalance can measure mass.

For cleanrooms, the replacement standard is ISO 14644-1 and is meant to completely replace Federal Standard 209E. This ISO Standard can be found through the non-profit organization, Institute of Environmental Sciences and Technology (IEST). Each of these standards represents the maximum allowable number of particles in a unit of air. The typical unit is either cubic feet or cubic meters. The particle counts are always listed as cumulative.

=== Liquid particle counters ===
Liquid particle counters are used to determine the quality of the liquid passing through them. The size and number of particles can determine if the liquid is clean enough to be used for the designed application. Liquid particle counters can be used to test the quality of drinking water or cleaning solutions, or the cleanliness of power generation equipment, manufacturing parts, or injectable drugs.

Liquid particle counters are also used to determine the cleanliness level of hydraulic fluids and various other systems including (engines, gears and compressors), the reason being that 75-80% of hydraulic breakdowns can be attributed to contamination. There are various types, installed on the equipment, operated in a laboratory as part of an oil analysis programme. or portable units that can be transported to site, e.g., a construction site, and then used on the machine, e.g., a bulldozer, to determine fluid cleanliness. By determining and monitoring these levels, and following a proactive or predictive maintenance program, the user can reduce hydraulic failures, increase uptime and machine availability, and to reduce oil consumption. They can also be used to assure that hydraulic fluids have been cleaned using filtration, to acceptable or target cleanliness levels. There are various standards in use in the hydraulic industry, of which ISO 4406:1999, NAS1638 and SAE AS 4059 are probably the most common.

A typical hydraulic oil cleanliness to iso 4406 is 20/18/15.

=== Solid particle counters ===
Solid particle counters are used to measure dry particles for various industrial applications. One such application could be for the detection of particle size coming from a rock crusher within a mining quarry. Sieves are the standard instruments used to measure dry particle size. Vision based systems are also used to measure dry particle size. With a vision based system quick and efficient particle sizing can be done with ease and tremendous accuracy.

== Specialized types ==
=== Remote particle counters ===
Small particle counters that are used to monitor a fixed location typically inside a cleanroom or mini-environment to continuously monitor particle levels. These smaller counters typically do not have a local display and are connected to a network of other particle counters and other types of sensors to monitoring the overall cleanroom performance. This network of sensors is typically connected to a facility monitoring system (FMS), data acquisition system or programmable logic controller.

This computer based system can integrate into a database, alarming and may have e-mail capability to notify facility or process personnel when conditions inside the cleanroom have exceeded predetermined environmental limits. Remote particle counters are available in several different configurations, from single channel to models that detect up to 8 channels simultaneously. Remote particle counters can have a particle size detection range from 0.1 to 100 micrometres and may feature one of a variety of output options including 4-20 mA, RS-485 Modbus, Ethernet and pulse output.

=== Manifold particle counters ===
Modified aerosol portable particle counter that has been attached to a sequencing sampling system. The sequencing sampling system allows for one particle counter to sample multiple locations, via a series of tubes drawing air from up to 32 locations inside a cleanroom. Typically less expensive than utilizing remote particle counters, each tube is monitored in sequence.

=== Hand-held particle counter ===
A hand-held particle counter is a small, self-contained device that is easily transported and used, and designed for use with Indoor Air Quality (IAQ) investigations. Though lower flow rates of 0.1 ft^{3}/min (0.2 m^{3}/h) than larger portables with 1 ft^{3}/m (2 m^{3}/h), hand-helds are useful for most of the same applications. However longer sample times may be required when performing cleanroom certification and testing. (Hand-held counters are not recommended for cleanrooms). Most hand-held particle counters have direct mount isokinetic sampling probes. One may use a barbed probe on a short piece of sample tubing, but it is recommended that the length of the tubing not exceed 6 ft (1.8 m), due to loss of larger particles in the sample tubing.

== Applications ==
Particle counters are used in applications where contamination control in manufacturing is required. Examples of these industries include: semiconductor manufacturing; electronic component manufacture and assembly; photonic and optics manufacture and assembly; aerospace; pharmaceutical and biotech production; medical device manufacturing; cosmetics production; and food and beverage production. They are also used in industrial applications such as oil and gas, hydraulic fluids and automotive assembly and painting.

A primary use of aerosol particle counters is in the determination of contamination levels within a cleanroom or clean containment device. Cleanrooms and clean containment devices maintain low levels of particulate-free air through the use of filters and are classified according to the number of particles permitted; the primary standard for cleanroom or clean air devices is ISO 14644-1, other local standards may also exist such as FED-STD-209E.

=== Electronics ===
Electronics manufacturing, and electronics assembly requires stringent environmental controls, especially where processes are performed within reactive conditions. Yields are reduced when components are contaminated with particles, and trace elements. Particle counters demonstrate that these controls are effective, and the production environments are optimized for the quality required.

Depending on the application and size of the particles of interest, different instrumentation is required.

==== General environments ====
Air particle monitoring is required for ensuring the manufacturing environment is free from contamination level that will cause defects. It is performed either for the entire cleanroom areas (ballrooms, bays and chases), or specific local controlled environments (tools and minienvironments).

Where large areas are to be monitored a manifold can be used, a manifold is a device used to connect many sample locations via sample tubing lengths, to a central stepper device and a central particle counter, it will sequentially move between tube locations taking a read from each location. Smaller spaces can be monitored using small point of use particle sensors, these are dedicated to sampling at a single location and rely on either a central vacuum supply or an internal sample pump. The contaminant particle size and frequency of measurement are factors in determining which method is most suitable.

==== Liquid systems ====
There are two primary liquid applications in the electronics manufacturing processes, fabrication process chemicals and ultra clean water for cleaning and rinsing.

Process chemicals are used in semiconductor and other critical product processing steps (chemical etch, mask removal and chemical mechanical polishing). Particle monitoring in process chemicals, from manufacture through to the point-of-use, is extremely important for these clean processes to be controlled to ensure yield and throughput quality. The use of on-line continuous particle monitoring enables both process engineers and facility engineers to respond rapidly to changes in chemical purity levels throughout the chemical distribution process.

Ultra-Pure Water (UPW) / DI Water is used for critical cleaning and rinsing steps, UPW processes must maintain very low particle concentration levels, typically measured at the 20 nm level. UPW is also commonly used for chemical dilution and flushing steps within chemical blending and distribution systems. The use of on-line continuous particle monitoring, either at the final water purification step or at the wafer point-of-use, provides process engineers the critical particle data needed to effectively manage the water purification and wafer cleaning processes.

Gas Systems. High purity gases are critical to advanced component manufacturing. Products such as integrated circuits require many process gases for: etching, deposition, oxidation, doping, and inert overlaying applications. Impurities in these gas streams can create failures in critical processes and impact yield and throughput. Gases that are explosive of hazardous are tested at pressure using particle counters contained within an inert gas, pressurized enclosure. Non-reactive gases can be depressurized using a clean path gas diffusion device and tested using a portable particle counter.

=== Life sciences ===
Life Science applications include industries such as pharmaceutical manufacturing, biotech manufacturing, compounding facilities, medical devices, nutraceuticals and food processing; they are those industries that create products to improve the lives of living organisms. Manufacturing environments should remove or reduce contaminants to minimize the risk of finished product contamination, which may lead to chemical reactions within the product or undesired quality of the product.

The industry is controlled through government oversight for the formulation, manufacture and release of all product, and controls are established and monitored to ensure production is maintained to the agreed quality criteria. Good Manufacturing Practices (GMP) ensures that product is manufactured to national and international standards by organizations such as the Food and Drug Administration (FDA), European Medicine Agency (EMA) and the World Health Organization (WHO), other national governmental bodies also regulate the manufacture of product for their countries.

==== General environments ====
Environments for the manufacture of drug products require controls to be used to ensure that total particulate and microbial aerosol burden are maintained at suitable levels to reduce risk of contamination to product. Environmental design considers the contamination in various process steps, including: raw material purification, formulation of product, final filling and packaging. Depending on the type of product being manufactured the level of clean controlled space is initially determined using the cleanroom classification standards, the higher the risk of contamination the cleaner the environment, e.g., aseptic filling is performed in an ISO 5 controlled environment, whereas terminally sterilized product is finished in an ISO 7 area (prior to final sterilization).

The classification of risk also contributes to the type of instrument used. General monitoring on a periodic basis uses portable equipment, moved from location to location as determined by a risk assessment. For more risk critical production these are performed in a machine that isolates the general environment from the process environment, the removal of personnel from the direct area using isolators or RABS increases confidence of control, these machines are monitored continuously using point of sample instruments giving continuous feedback as to the quality of the environment and any contamination events in real time. The primary concern for contamination is risk of adverse effects by the end user, a resultant demonstration of control, is an increase in production. The general environments are also monitored for any microbial contaminants using traditional techniques such as settle plates and volumetric air samplers.

==== Liquid systems ====
Liquid systems are used primarily in a laboratory to demonstrate the absence of particles in finished liquid products. Any particles present may be a contaminant or undesired agglomerations of insoluble product. Liquids for injection have regulated limits for maximum particle concentrations, standards contained within the United States Pharmacopeia (USP), European Pharmacopeia (EP) and Japanese Pharmacopeia (JP) define these limits.

==== Gas systems ====
Compressed gases used in formulation, conveying and overlaying are required to meet the same standards for GMP compliance as all environmental air quality and should be tested at point of use. Particle counters fitted with gas pressure diffusion devices reduce line pressure to atmospheric without impacting the flow path of particles within the airstream, the gas is then tested at atmospheric pressure.

=== Industrial ===
Other industries also use particle counters to demonstrate either cleanliness of manufacturing environments or quality of finished product. These combine to reduce any additional cleaning processes.

==== Automotive ====
Painting automobiles in clean environments reduces the need to rework defects in paint finishes. Particle counters located within the clean areas give continuous feedback to quality engineers, ensuring clean conditions are maintained. Engines built to exacting tolerances are cleaned and assembled in clean areas, using cleaning agents verified using particle counters.

==== Hydraulic fluids ====
Hydraulic fluids and oils must meet specific ISO 4406 standards. The application of hydraulic fluids vary from aerospace and turbine cooling and lubrication to heavy machinery. The build up and presence of particles can cause failure of bearings, pumps and seals.

==== Water ====
Water is a universal product with an unlimited number of applications and can be contaminated due to intentional interactions with processes or unintentional and seasonal variances. Monitoring the quality of water using particle counters, either by spot checking at a sample location or continuously monitoring a distribution system, allows quality engineers to react to changes in the processes where water is being used.

Particle counters are used to determine the filtration rates, chemical addition requirements, flushing intervals, sedimentation information, cooling flowrates and other process variables that allow for continuous feedback, ensuring a consistent quality of water to a process.

==== Environmental ====
Particulates exist in the atmosphere at concentrations that can be deleterious to health, and have been proven to factor into causes of many airborne illnesses such as asthma. Types of atmospheric particles include suspended particulate matter; thoracic and respirable particles; inhalable coarse particles, designated PM10, which are coarse particles with a diameter of 10 micrometers (μm) or less; fine particles, designated PM2.5, with a diameter of 2.5 μm or less; ultrafine particles; and soot.

Particle counters are used to monitor atmospheric contamination levels of these suspended particulates, allowing for the reduction of particles associated with a specific source (e.g. combustion) or technology (e.g. power generation). The modelling of particulate data from particle counters distributed globally gives trend information to the state of quality of air and its migration.

== See also ==
- Particle mass analyser
- Particulate matter sampler
- Aerosol mass spectrometry
