= Microbalance =

Type of weight scale

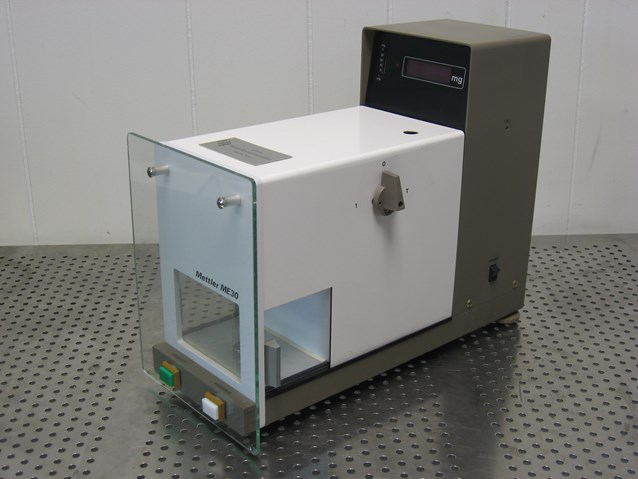
- Quartz crystal microbalance
- Uses: Measuring masses to the millionth of a gram

A microbalance is an instrument capable of making precise measurements of weight of objects of relatively small mass: of the order of a million parts of a gram. In comparison, a standard analytical balance is 100 times less sensitive; i.e. it is limited in precision to 0.1 milligrams. Microbalances are generally used in a laboratory as standalone instruments but are also incorporated into other instruments, such as thermogravimetry, sorption/desorption systems, and surface property instruments. It is the precision of the microbalance that distinguishes it from other weighing devices.

== Types ==
A quartz crystal microbalance (QCM) is a very sensitive mass deposition sensor based on the piezoelectric properties of the quartz crystal. This technique uses the changes in resonance frequency of the crystal to measure the mass on the surface because the resonance frequency is highly dependent on any changes of the crystal mass. A quartz crystal microbalance is capable of measuring mass deposition down to 0.1 nanograms. The sensitivity of the microbalance is lessened the closer the fulcrum is to the middle.

A tapered element oscillating microbalance (TEOM) is an instrument used for real-time detection of aerosol particles by measuring their mass concentration. It makes use of a small vibrating glass tube whose oscillation frequency changes when aerosol particles are deposited on it. TEOM-based devices have been approved by the U.S. Environmental Protection Agency for environmental air quality monitoring, and by the U.S. Mine Safety and Health Administration for monitoring coal dust exposure for miners to prevent several respiratory diseases.

Alternative types of torsional balances include:

- Quartz fibre torsion ultramicrobalance
- Torsion ultramicrobalance
- Torsion nanobalance
- Ultramicrobalance
- Nanobalance

== See also ==
- List of measuring devices
