= Particle mass analyser =

Measurement technique for classifying aerosol particles

A Particle mass analyser (PMA) is an instrument for classifying aerosol particles according to their mass-to-charge ratio using opposing electrical and centrifugal forces. This allows the classifier to select particles of a specified mass-to-charge ratio independent of particle shape.

It one of the three types of monodisperse aerosol classifier, the others being the differential mobility analyser (DMA, for electrical mobility size), and the aerodynamic aerosol classifier (AAC, for relaxation time, or aerodynamic diameter). The corresponding three quantities are related by the expression τ = mB, where τ is relaxation time, m is mass and B is mobility.

Further work improved the technique by engineering the centrifugal force to match the electrostatic force across the whole classification region, thus increasing the throughput.
