= ISO 11171 =

ISO 11171 is an international standard for calibrating liquid particle counters. As the functionality of hydraulic fluids suffers when contaminated with particles, particle counters are used for contamination control. The particle counter determines the concentration and the size distribution of the particles. Therefore, the accuracy of the liquid particle counter has to be established through calibration. According to ISO 11171 for the primary particle-sizing calibration NIST SRM 2806 suspension has to be used. In annex "F" of ISO 11171, preparation of secondary calibration suspension is described.

In general ISO 11171 specifies procedures for two different subjects:

- sample preparation
- sensor calibration (particle-sizing calibration, coincidence error, resolution and flow rate limit determination etc.)

== Source document ==
- ISO 11171:2010(E) Hydraulic fluid power – Calibration of automatic particle counters for liquids, ISO 2010,
