= Tapered element oscillating microbalance =

Aerosol particle detection tool

A tapered element oscillating microbalance (TEOM) is an instrument used for real-time detection of aerosol particles by measuring their mass concentration. It makes use of a small vibrating glass tube whose oscillation frequency changes when aerosol particles are deposited on it increasing its inertia. TEOM-based devices have been approved by the U.S. Environmental Protection Agency for environmental air quality monitoring, and by the U.S. Mine Safety and Health Administration for monitoring coal dust exposure for miners to prevent several respiratory diseases.

== Operation ==
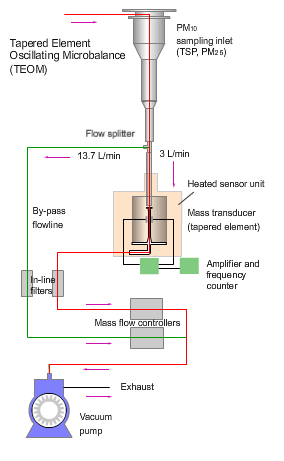
A diagram showing the operation of a tapered element oscillating microbalance instrument.

The TEOM uses a hollow glass tube as a microbalance. Incoming particles are deposited on a filter at the tip of the tube, and the added mass causes a change in its oscillation frequency which is detected electronically. The element is periodically cycled to return it to its natural frequency. The inlet to the device only allows particles of the desired size range to enter. TEOM devices operate continuously and do not need filter changes as frequently as high-volume air samplers.

Mechanical noise and dramatic temperature fluctuations can interfere with the operation of a TEOM device. In addition, water droplets cannot be distinguished from particle mass, so the device must adjust the incoming air temperature to cause water droplets to evaporate, or contain a dryer or humidity sensor to adjust the readings. Under ideal conditions, TEOM is just as accurate as the standard reference method, but its sensitivity presents complications for use for environmental monitoring in urban areas.

A filter dynamic measurement system (FDMS) can be used to adjust for the volatile component of the mass. TEOM has poor sensitivity to semi-volatile particles due to the temperature and humidity conditions used. TEOM instruments with FDMS alternate between a base cycle and a reference cycle, the latter of which measures the mass loss of the filter when clean air is passed through it, allowing the mass loss during the base cycle to be estimated. It is important that the air conditioning system not cycle over the same period as the TEOM instrument, because this can cause aliasing.

== Applications ==
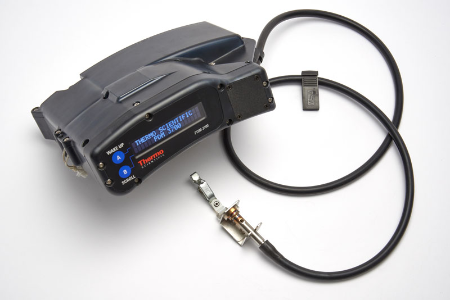
A personal dust monitor

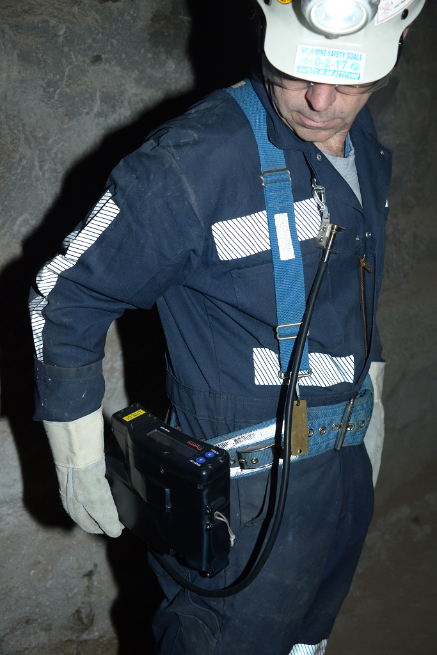
A continuous personal dust monitor at use in a mine

Instruments using TEOM have been designated as Federal Equivalent Methods by the U.S. Environmental Protection Agency for environmental air quality monitoring of both coarse and fine particulate matter (PM_{10}, PM_{2.5}, and PMc). TEOM instruments are faster than and avoid difficulties with beta attenuation and quartz crystal microbalance (QCM) methods.

TEOM is the basis for a continuous personal dust monitor (CPDM) for coal dust in mines, to protect workers from exposure to coal mine dust which leads to black lung disease and progressive massive fibrosis. Prior to the introduction of CPDMs, dust particles collected on a filter needed to be analyzed in a laboratory, leading to a delay of weeks in obtaining results. Continuous monitoring allows miners to take corrective action such as moving to another area or changing their activities if dust levels exceed exposure limits. In one study this led to a 90% reduction in samples exceeding the dust exposure limit. In February 2016, the U.S. Mine Safety and Health Administration (MSHA) mandated the use of CPDMs on working sections of underground coal mines, and for workers who have evidence of the development of pneumoconiosis. As of 2017, the only CPDM instrument approved by MSHA uses a TEOM.

As of 2013, TEOM was not considered suitable for workplace monitoring of nanomaterials due to its cut-off particle sizes of 10, 2.5, or 1 μm, and the physical size of the instrument.

== History ==
TEOM is a proprietary technology developed by Rupprecht and Patashnick Co., Inc. of Albany, New York, whose successor company (as of 2005) is Thermo Fisher Scientific. "TEOM" is a registered trademark. It was originally developed as a fixed-site environmental particulate mass monitor, and TEOM aerosol detectors were available in 1981.

Development of the continuous personal dust monitor was originally performed by Rupprecht and Patashnick Co., Inc. and continued by Thermo Fisher under contract from the U.S. National Institute for Occupational Safety and Health with input from other government, labor, and industry organizations. Machine-mounted continuous dust monitors have been available since 1997.
