= Triple beam balance =

Instrument used to measure the mass of an object

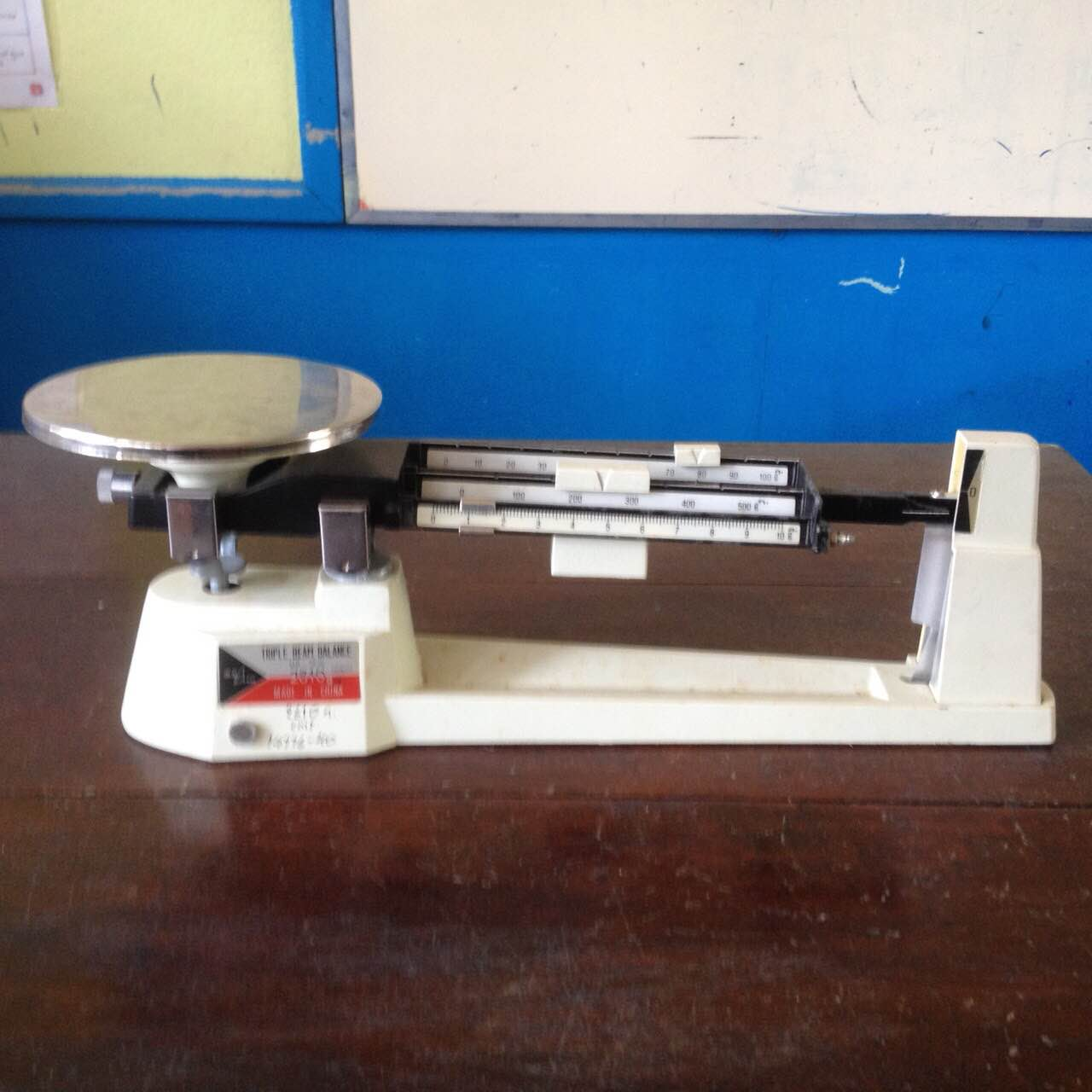
Triple beam balance

The triple beam balance is an instrument used to measure weight or mass very precisely. Such devices typically have a reading error of ±0.05 grams. Its name refers to its three beams, where the middle beam is the largest, the far beam of medium size, and the front beam the smallest. The difference in size of the beams indicates the difference in weights and reading scale that each beam measures. Typically, the reading scale of the middle beam reads in 100 gram increments, the far beam in 10 gram increments, and the front beam can read from 0 to 10 grams. The triple beam balance can be used to measure mass directly from the objects, find mass by difference for liquid, and measure out substances.

== Parts ==
The parts of triple beam balance are identified as the following.

1. Weighing pan - The area in which an object is placed in order to be weighed.
2. Base - The base rests underneath the weighing pan and can usually be customized to fit on a workbench or set up with tripod legs.
3. Beams - The three beams on the balance are used to set the level of precision, with each beam working at different increments (1-10 grams, 10 grams and 100 grams). When using the triple beam balance, it is recommended that one start with the lowest level of precision (e.g 100 gram increments). For example, if an object weighs 327 grams, the 100 gram pointer will drop below the fixed mark on the 4th notch (400g); it will then need to be moved back to the third notch (300g). This process will then need to be repeated for the 10 gram increments (20g) and then single figure units (7g).
4. Riders - The riders are the sliding pointers placed on top of the balance beams to indicate the mass in grams on the pan and beam.
5. Pointers - The scale pointer marks the equal point of the object's mass on the scale and mass on the beam
6. Zero adjustment knob - This is used to manually adjust the triple beam balance to the 'zero' mark (check to ensure that the pointer is at zero before use).

Before using triple beam balance, the scale pointer should be at zero. The zero adjustment knob can be used to adjust the scale pointer. The objects are placed on the pan and the riders are adjusted. The hundred rider should be initially adjusted and follow by the tens rider. The ones rider is adjusted until the scale pointer is at zero again.

== Image ==
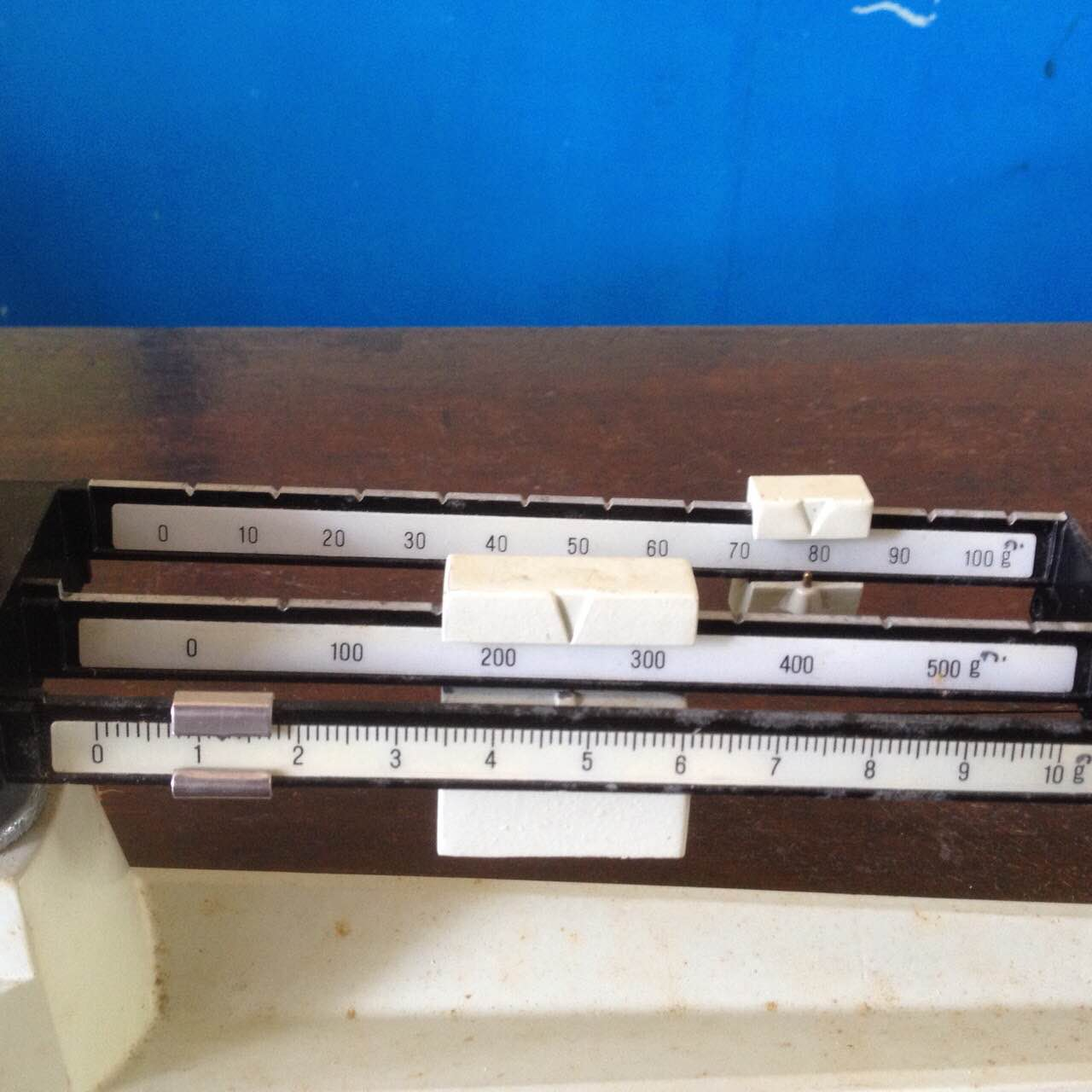
Reading scale of a triple beam balance

== See also ==
- Analytical balance
- Weighing scale
