= Electrical aerosol spectrometer =

Electrical aerosol spectrometry (EAS) is a technique for measurement of the number-size distribution of aerosol using a combination of electrical charging and multiple solid state electrometer detectors. The technique combines both diffusion and field charging regimes to cover the diameter range 10 nm to 10 μm.

Subsequent developments of the technique enable measurements faster than 1 Hz, although in each case with a reduced size range.

== Aerosol charging ==
High charging efficiency allows sufficient charge to be placed on individual particles that the use of electrometer detectors is practicable, while the use of parallel electrometer detectors allows real time measurement of the size/number spectrum with output data as fast as 0.25 Hz.

Unlike SMPS-type devices, multiple charging is an inherent issue across almost the entire size range of EAS-type devices. Accurate characterization of the electrical charging of the aerosol is therefore an essential component of device design.

== Calibration ==
Techniques for the traceable calibration of such devices are established, and result in good agreement (subject to suitable signal levels) with slower but more sensitive scanning mobility particle sizers.

== Applications ==
Applications include the measurement of engine exhaust, cigarette smoke, and ambient/atmospheric studies.

The technique is particularly appropriate for situations where aerosol concentrations are changing on a timescale of 1 s or faster.
