= Analytical balance =

Type of digital balance

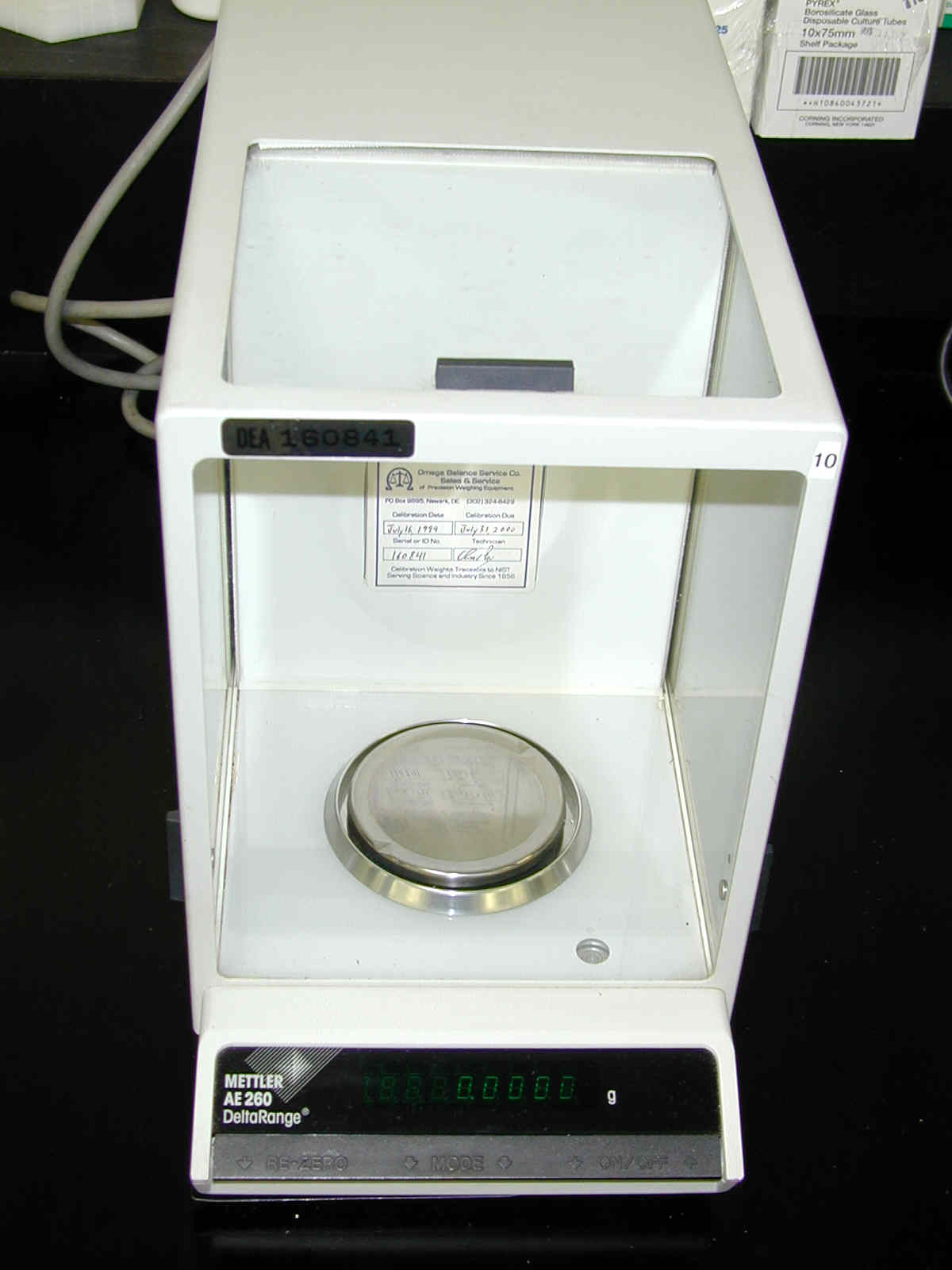
Mettler digital analytical balance with 0.5 mg readability

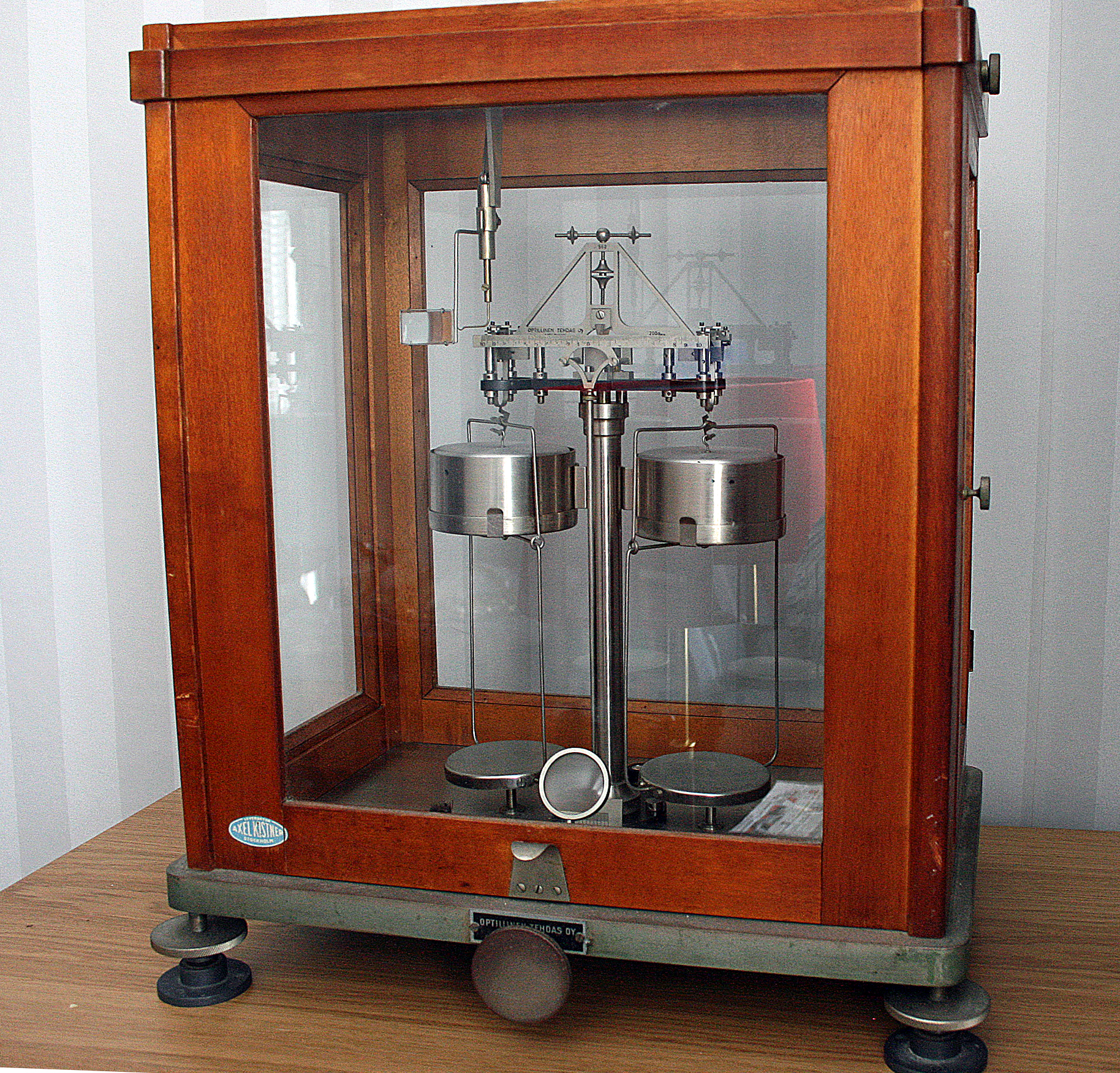
Mechanical analytical balance

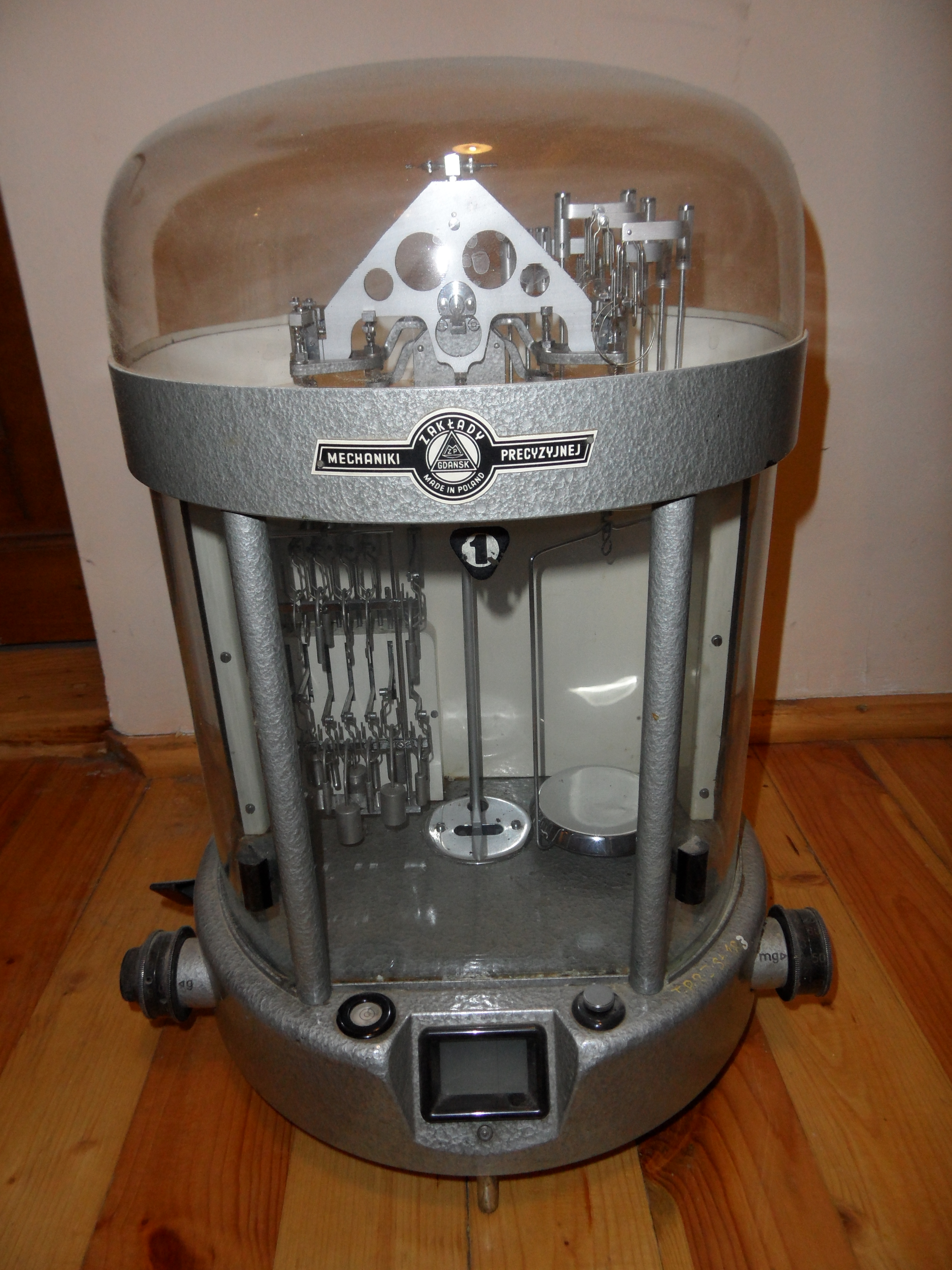
Automated analytical balance, 1950s

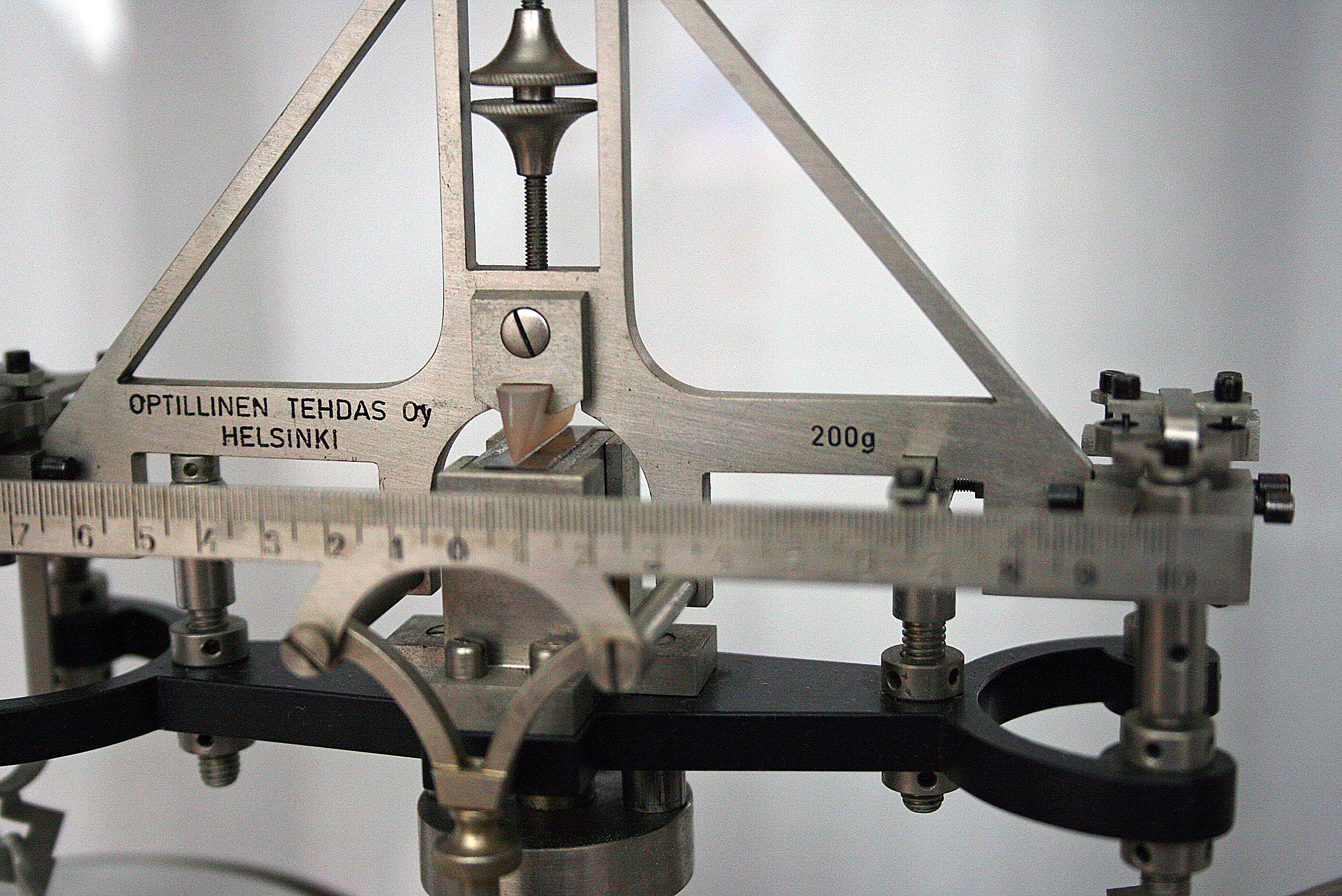
Mechanical analytical balance (detail)

An analytical balance (or chemical balance) is a class of balance designed to measure small mass in the sub-milligram range. The measuring pan of an analytical balance (0.1 mg resolution or better) is inside a transparent enclosure with doors so that dust does not collect and so any air currents in the room do not affect the balance's operation. This enclosure is often called a draft shield. The use of a mechanically vented balance safety enclosure, which has uniquely designed acrylic airfoils, allows a smooth turbulence-free airflow that prevents balance fluctuation and the measure of mass down to 1 μg without fluctuations or loss of product. Also, the sample must be at room temperature to prevent natural convection from forming air currents inside the enclosure and causing an error in reading. Single pan mechanical substitution balance is a method of maintaining consistent response throughout the useful capacity of the balance. This is achieved by maintaining a constant load on the balance beam and thus the fulcrum, by subtracting mass on the same side of the beam as which the sample is added.

Electronic analytical scales measure the force needed to counter the mass being measured rather than balancing a beam with reference masses. As such they must have calibration adjustments made to compensate for gravitational differences from changing locations and altitudes. They use an electromagnet to generate a force to counter the sample being measured and output the result by measuring the power (and resulting force) needed to achieve balance. Such a measurement device is called an electromagnetic force restoration sensor.

There are three main types of analytical balances, electronic analytical balances, single-disk analytical balances, and electro-optical analytical balances. Electronic analytical balances are one of the commonly used instruments in chemical laboratories.

The original mechanical analytical balance was developed in the mid-18th century by Joseph Black, a Scottish chemist and physicist.

== Triple beam balance ==
A Triple beam balance is an instrument used to measure mass very precisely. The device has reading error of +/- 0.05 gram. The name refers to the three beams including the middle beam which is the largest size, the front beam which is generally a medium size, and the far beam which is generally the smallest size. The differences in the size of the beams indicates the difference in weights and the reading scales that each beam carries. The reading scale can be enumerated such that the middle beam reads in 100 gram increments, the far beam can read from 0 to 10 grams, and the front beam can read in 10 gram increments. The parts of a triple beam balance are identified as following:

1. Weighing pan - The area in which an object is placed in order to be weighed.
2. Base - The base rests underneath the weighing pan and can usually be customised to fit on a workbench or set up with tripod legs.
3. Beams - The three beams on the balance are used to set the level of precision, with each beam working at different increments (generally 1-10 grams, 10 grams and 100 grams). When using the triple beam balance, it is recommended to start with the lowest level of precision (e.g. 100 gram increments) and then work your way down. For example, if your object weighs 327 grams the 100 gram pointer will drop below the fixed mark on the 4th notch (400g), so you will then need to move this back to the third notch (300g). This process will then need to be repeated for the 10 gram increments (20g) and then single figure units (7g).
4. Riders - The riders are the sliding pointers placed on top of the balance beams to indicate the mass in grams on the pan and beam.
5. Pointers - The scale pointer marks the equal point of the object's mass on the scale and mass on the beam
6. Zero adjustment knob - This is used to manually adjust the triple beam balance to the 'zero' mark (check to ensure that the pointer is at zero before use).

Before using a triple beam balance, the scale pointer should be at zero. The zero adjustment knob can be used to adjust the scale pointer. Place the objects on the pan and adjust the riders until the scale pointer is at zero again, and then sum the weights marked (e.g. the 4th notch of 100 gram beam is 400g) to find the weight of the sample.

== See also ==
- Weighing scale
- Microbalance
