= Electrical mobility =

Ability of charged particles to move through a medium in response to an electric field

Electrical mobility is the ability of charged particles (such as electrons or protons) to move through a medium in response to an electric field that is pulling them. The separation of ions according to their mobility in gas phase is called ion mobility spectrometry, in liquid phase it is called electrophoresis.

== Theory ==
When a charged particle in a gas or liquid is acted upon by a uniform electric field, it will be accelerated until it reaches a constant drift velocity according to the formula
$$v_\text{d} = \mu E,$$
where

- $v_\text{d}$ is the drift velocity (SI units: m/s),
- $E$ is the magnitude of the applied electric field (V/m),
- $\mu$ is the mobility (m^{2}/(V·s)).

In other words, the electrical mobility of the particle is defined as the ratio of the drift velocity to the magnitude of the electric field:
$$\mu = \frac{v_\text{d}}{E}.$$

For example, the mobility of the sodium ion (Na^{+}) in water at 25 °C is 5.19×10^{−8} m^{2}/(V·s). This means that a sodium ion in an electric field of 1 V/m would have an average drift velocity of 5.19×10^{−8} m/s. Such values can be obtained from measurements of ionic conductivity and transference number in solution.

Electrical mobility is proportional to the net charge of the particle. This was the basis for Robert Millikan's demonstration that electrical charges occur in discrete units, whose magnitude is the charge of the electron.

Electrical mobility is also inversely proportional to the Stokes radius $a$ of the ion, which is the effective radius of the moving ion including any molecules of water or other solvent that move with it. This is true because the solvated ion moving at a constant drift velocity $s$ is subject to two equal and opposite forces: an electrical force $zeE$ and a frictional force $F_\text{drag} = fs = (6 \pi \eta a)s$, where $f$ is the frictional coefficient, $\eta$ is the solution viscosity. For different ions with the same charge such as Li^{+}, Na^{+} and K^{+} the electrical forces are equal, so that the drift speed and the mobility are inversely proportional to the radius $a$. In fact, conductivity measurements show that ionic mobility increases from Li^{+} to Cs^{+}, and therefore that Stokes radius decreases from Li^{+} to Cs^{+}. This is the opposite of the order of ionic radii for crystals and shows that in solution the smaller ions (Li^{+}) are more extensively hydrated than the larger (Cs^{+}).

== Mobility in gas phase ==
Mobility is defined for any species in the gas phase, encountered mostly in plasma physics and is defined as
$$\mu = \frac{q}{m \nu_\text{m}},$$
where

- $q$ is the charge of the species,
- $\nu_\text{m}$ is the momentum-transfer collision frequency,
- $m$ is the mass.

Mobility is related to the species' diffusion coefficient $D$ through an exact (thermodynamically required) equation known as the Einstein relation:
$$\mu = \frac{q}{kT} D,$$
where

- $k$ is the Boltzmann constant,
- $T$ is the gas temperature,
- $D$ is the diffusion coefficient.

If one defines the mean free path in terms of momentum transfer, then one gets for the diffusion coefficient
$$D = \frac{\pi}{8} \lambda^2 \nu_\text{m}.$$

But both the momentum-transfer mean free path and the momentum-transfer collision frequency are difficult to calculate. Many other mean free paths can be defined. In the gas phase, $\lambda$ is often defined as the diffusional mean free path, by assuming that a simple approximate relation is exact:
$$D = \frac{1}{2} \lambda v,$$
where $v$ is the root mean square speed of the gas molecules:
$$v = \sqrt{\frac{3kT}{m}},$$
where $m$ is the mass of the diffusing species. This approximate equation becomes exact when used to define the diffusional mean free path.

== Applications ==
Electrical mobility is the basis for electrostatic precipitation, used to remove particles from exhaust gases on an industrial scale. The particles are given a charge by exposing them to ions from an electrical discharge in the presence of a strong field. The particles acquire an electrical mobility and are driven by the field to a collecting electrode.

Instruments exist which select particles with a narrow range of electrical mobility, or particles with electrical mobility larger than a predefined value. The former are generally referred to as "differential mobility analyzers". The selected mobility is often identified with the diameter of a singly charged spherical particle, thus the "electrical-mobility diameter" becomes a characteristic of the particle, regardless of whether it is actually spherical.

Passing particles of the selected mobility to a detector such as a condensation particle counter allows the number concentration of particles with the currently selected mobility to be measured. By varying the selected mobility over time, mobility vs concentration data may be obtained. This technique is applied in scanning mobility particle sizers.
