= Beta attenuation monitoring =

Air monitoring technique

The schematic of a beta attenuation monitor (BAM). The detector allows to assess cumulative mass concentration of suspended particulate matter (PM) in the ambient air. Notation: 1 – air inlet; 2 – cycling ribbon; 3 and 4 – beta radiation sources; D1 and D2 – beta radiation detectors; 5 – air pump; 6 – air exhaust.

Beta attenuation monitoring (BAM) is an air monitoring technique employing the absorption of beta radiation by solid particles extracted from air flow. The technique allows for the detection of PM_{10} and PM_{2.5}, which are monitored by most air pollution regulatory agencies. The main principle is based on a kind of Bouguer (Lambert–Beer) law: the amount by which the flow of beta radiation (electrons) is attenuated by a solid matter is exponentially dependent on its mass and not on any other feature (such as density, chemical composition or some optical or electrical properties) of this matter. So, the air is drawn from outside of the detector through an "infinite" (cycling) ribbon made from some filtering material so that the particles are collected on it. There are two sources of beta radiation, placed one before and one after the region where air flow passes through the ribbon, leaving particles on it; and there are also two detectors on the opposite side of the ribbon, facing the detectors. The sources' intensity and detectors' sensitivity being the same (or corrected with appropriate calibration lookup table), the intensity of beta rays detected by one of the detectors is compared to that of the other. Thus, one can deduce how much mass has the ribbon acquired upon being exposed to air flow; knowing the drain velocity, actual particle mass concentration in air could be assessed.

The radiation source can be a gas chamber, filled with ^{86}Kr gas, or a pieces of ^{14}C-rich polymer plastic, such as PMMA. Detector is simply a Geiger–Mueller counter. The particulate matter content measured is affected by the moisture content in the air, unfortunately.

To discriminate between particles of different sizes (e. g., between PM_{10} and PM_{2.5}), some preliminary separation could be accomplished, for example, by a cyclone battery.

A similar method exists, where instead of beta particle flow, an X-ray Fluorescence Spectroscopic monitoring is applied on either side of the air flow contact with the ribbon. This allows to obtain not only cumulative measurement of particle mass but also to detect their average chemical composition (the technique works for potassium and elements heavier than it).

== See also ==
- Atmospheric particulate matter
- Air pollution
- Air quality monitoring
- Cyclonic separation
- X-ray fluorescence
- Air filter

== Literature ==
- List of Designated Reference and Equivalent Methods. EPA: Research Triangle park, 2013. Online: .
