= Scanning mobility particle sizer =

A scanning mobility particle sizer (SMPS) is an analytical instrument that measures the size and number concentration of aerosol particles with diameters from 2.5 nm to 1000 nm. They employ a continuous, fast-scanning technique to provide high-resolution measurements.

== Applications ==
The particles that are investigated can be of biological or chemical nature. The instrument can be used for air quality measurement indoors, vehicle exhaust, research in bioaerosols, atmospheric studies, and toxicology testing.

== Principle of operation ==
The air to be analyzed is pumped through an ionizing source (or neutralizer) which will establish a known charge distribution. Then, exposure to an electric field in the DMA will isolate a certain particle diameter, which is a function of the voltage generating the field (a voltage value corresponding to a particle diameter value that passes through the DMA). Finally, these particles of the same diameter will be counted by an optical device (CPC). The air inlet to be analyzed can be equipped with an impaction head.

=== Impaction head ===
An impaction head, or fractionator head, is a device that uses the principles of fluid mechanics to trap, by their inertia, the largest particles present in the air. The sampling inlet of the SMPS is thus protected from large dust and insects, the air that enters it contains only the fine particles to be quantified. These are usually called "PM10 inlet" or "PM2.5 inlet".

=== Neutralizer ===
The air flow then passes through an ionizing source. The sampled air will be exposed to high concentrations of positive and negative ions, after a certain number of collisions the charge distribution will be stable and known. The neutralizer is also used to eliminate electrostatic charges from aerosol particles. The charge distribution from the neutralizer is a balanced charge distribution that follows Boltzmann's law.

=== DMA (Differential Mobility Analyzer) ===
The sample then enters a differential mobility analyzer. The air and aerosol (whose charge distribution is now balanced and known) are then introduced into an air flow channel. A central tubular electrode, and another concentric one, generate an electric field in this fluid path. In the channel, the particles are subjected to a uniform electric field and an air flow. The particles then move at a speed that depends on their electrical mobility. At a given voltage, only particles of a certain diameter will follow this channel until they exit; the smaller and larger will crash into the electrodes.

=== CPC (Condensation particle counter) ===
The air now contains only particles of a certain diameter. The flow is introduced into a CPC, a condensation particle counter, which measures the concentration of particles in an aerosol sample. The CPC works by using butanol vapor condensation on the particles present in the air sample. The particles are exposed to butanol vapor heated to 39 °C. The butanol vapor condenses on the particles, increasing their size and thus facilitating their optical detection. The particles are then exposed to a laser beam, and each particle scatters light. The peaks of scattered light intensity are continuously counted and expressed in particles/cm^{3}.

=== Results ===
The results obtained by this type of device therefore include the distribution of particle sizes in the air continuously. The DMA will generate voltage back-and-forth between its electrodes from 0 to 10,000 V, corresponding to a measurement range of 8 nm to 800 or 1000 nm, and the CPC will quantify each of these diameters.
