= Condensation particle counter =

Type of particle counter

The schematic of a condensation particle counter, operated by diffusional thermal cooling. Drawn according to the description at http://www.cas.manchester.ac.uk/restools/instruments/aerosol/cpc/. Notation: 1 – air inlet; 2 – porous material block, which is heated to saturator temperature, 3 – working fluid in reservoir, 4 – condenser, 5 – focusing nozzle, 6 – laser-based counter, 7 – air pump, 8 – air exhaust.

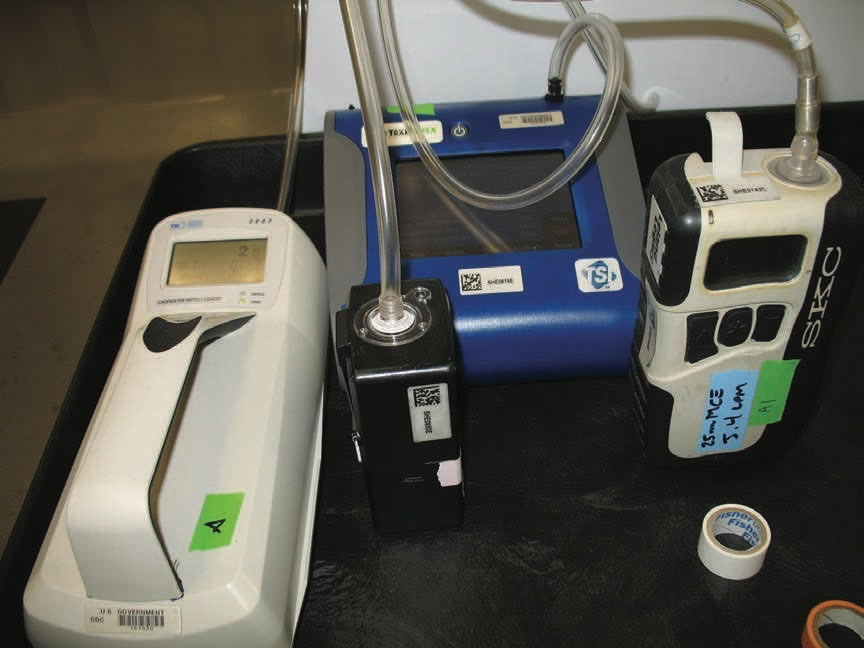
Equipment used for area sampling of airborne nanomaterials. The instruments shown here include a condensation particle counter, aerosol photometer, and two air sampling pumps for filter-based analysis.

A condensation particle counter or CPC is a particle counter that detects and counts aerosol particles by first enlarging them by using the particles as nucleation centers to create droplets in a supersaturated gas.

Three techniques have been used to produce nucleation:

- Adiabatic expansion using an expansion chamber. This was the original technique used by John Aitken in 1888.
- Thermal diffusion.
- Mixing of hot and cold gases.

The most usually used (also the most efficient) method is cooling by thermal diffusion. Most abundantly used working fluid is n-butanol, though in recent years water has also been used.

Condensation particle counters are able to detect particles with dimensions from 2 nm and larger. This is of special importance because particles sized down from 50 nm are generally undetectable with conventional optical techniques. Usually the supersaturation is ca. 100…200 % in condensation chamber, despite the fact that heterogeneous nucleation (droplet growth on surface of a suspended solid particle) can occur at supersaturation as small as 1%. The greater vapour content is needed because, according to surface science laws, the vapour pressure over a convex surface is less than over a plane, thus greater content of vapor in air is required to meet actual supersaturation criteria. This amount grows (vapor pressure decreases) along with decrease in particle size, the critical diameter for which condensation can occur at the present saturation level is called Kelvin diameter. The supersaturation level must, however, be small enough to prevent homogeneous nucleation (when liquid molecules collide so often that they form clusters – stable enough to ensure further growth is possible), which will produce false counts. This usually starts at ca. 300% supersaturation.

On the right, a diffusional thermal cooling CPC is shown in operation. In order to ensure a high vapour content, the working liquid is in contact with a hollow block of porous material that is heated. Then the humified air enters the cooler where nucleation occur. Temperature difference between the heater and the cooler determines the supersaturation, which in its turn determines the minimal size of particles that will be detected (the greater the difference, the smaller particles get counted). As proper nucleation conditions occur in the center of the flow, sometimes incoming flow is divided: most of it undergoes filtering and forms the sheath flow, which the rest of flow, still containing particles, is inserted into via a capillary. The more uniform is obtained supersaturation, the sharper is particle minimal size cutoff. During the heterogeneous nucleation process in the nucleation chamber, particles grow up to 10…12 μm large and so are conveniently detected by usual techniques, such as laser nephelometry (measurement of light pulses scattered by the grown-up particles).
