= Digital Weight Indicator =

Digital Weight Indicator also commonly called Weight Indicator is a system of indication or recording of the selector type or one that advances intermittently in which all values are presented digitally, or in numbers. In a digital indicating or recording element, or in digital representation, there are no graduations. The National Conference on Weights and Measures (NWCM) lists these device types as “Indicating Elements” in its certificate databases.

The National Conference on Weights and Measures have categorized Digital Weight Indicator as a Verified Conformity Assessment Program (VCAP). A program has been proposed by the National Conference on Weights and Measures to ensure compliance of certain device types with environmental requirements.

Over the years, it gets more intelligent and complicated than conventional weighing scales. It can interact with different devices such as a load cell, printer, and computer via cables.

== Interactions ==
=== With load cell ===
Load cell will produce a small electric current when weight is applied. The electric current is sent to Digital Weight Indicator via a normal cable. The Digital Weight Indicator will amplify the electric current and translate it to digital weight. Example: 15.7 kg

=== With printer ===
When attached to a printer via a printer cable, it can print the weight on paper. Usually Weight Indicator come with a basic printing feature. It can be program in the firmware to print in few basic format. Usually there is a print button on the Digital Weight Indicator for user to press to print.

=== With computer ===
A computer can be connected to it via a serial cable to RS-232 port on the computer. Information like weight, unit weight, status (stable, unstable, error) is sent to the computer in a particular format. The format is not standard and differs with each brand. A computer interpret the information received and display them on screen and print it on printer. With user interaction, user can enters other information in relation to the weight received and save them to a database. By storing information in a database, many other process can be automated by software application like invoicing, quality control, batch control, warehousing, distribution, and more.
