= Weighing scale =

Instrument to measure the weight of an object

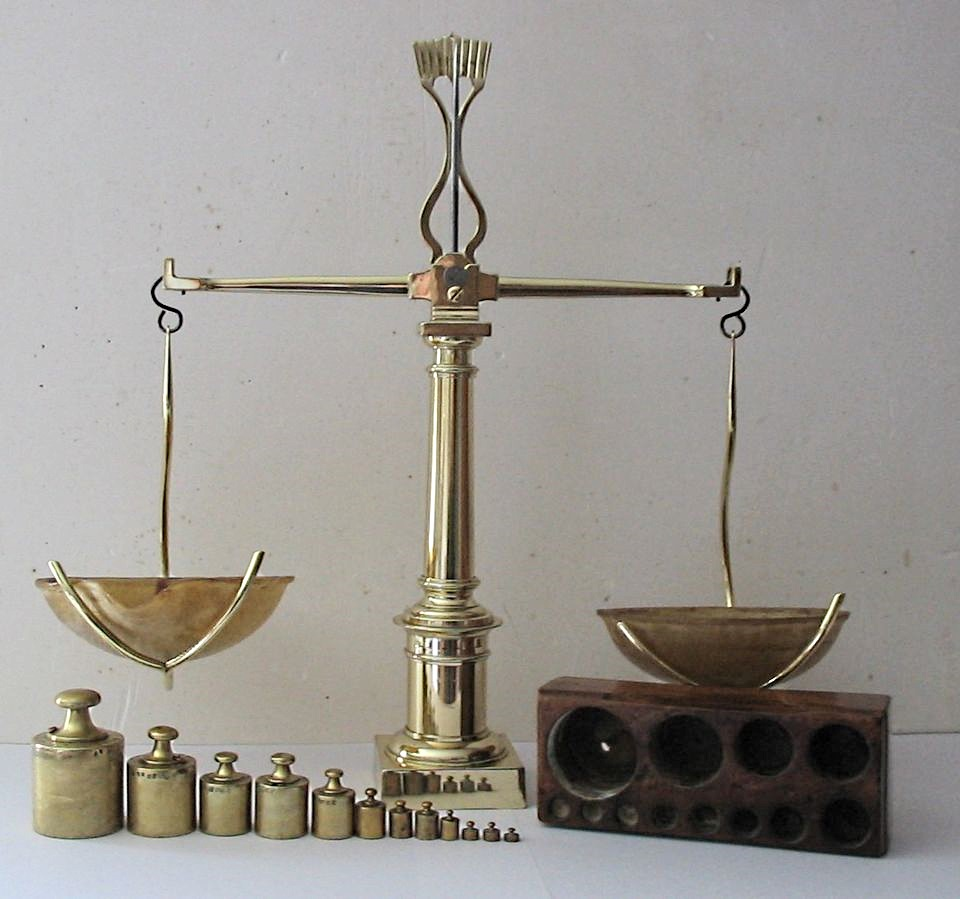
Balance scale set, with weights

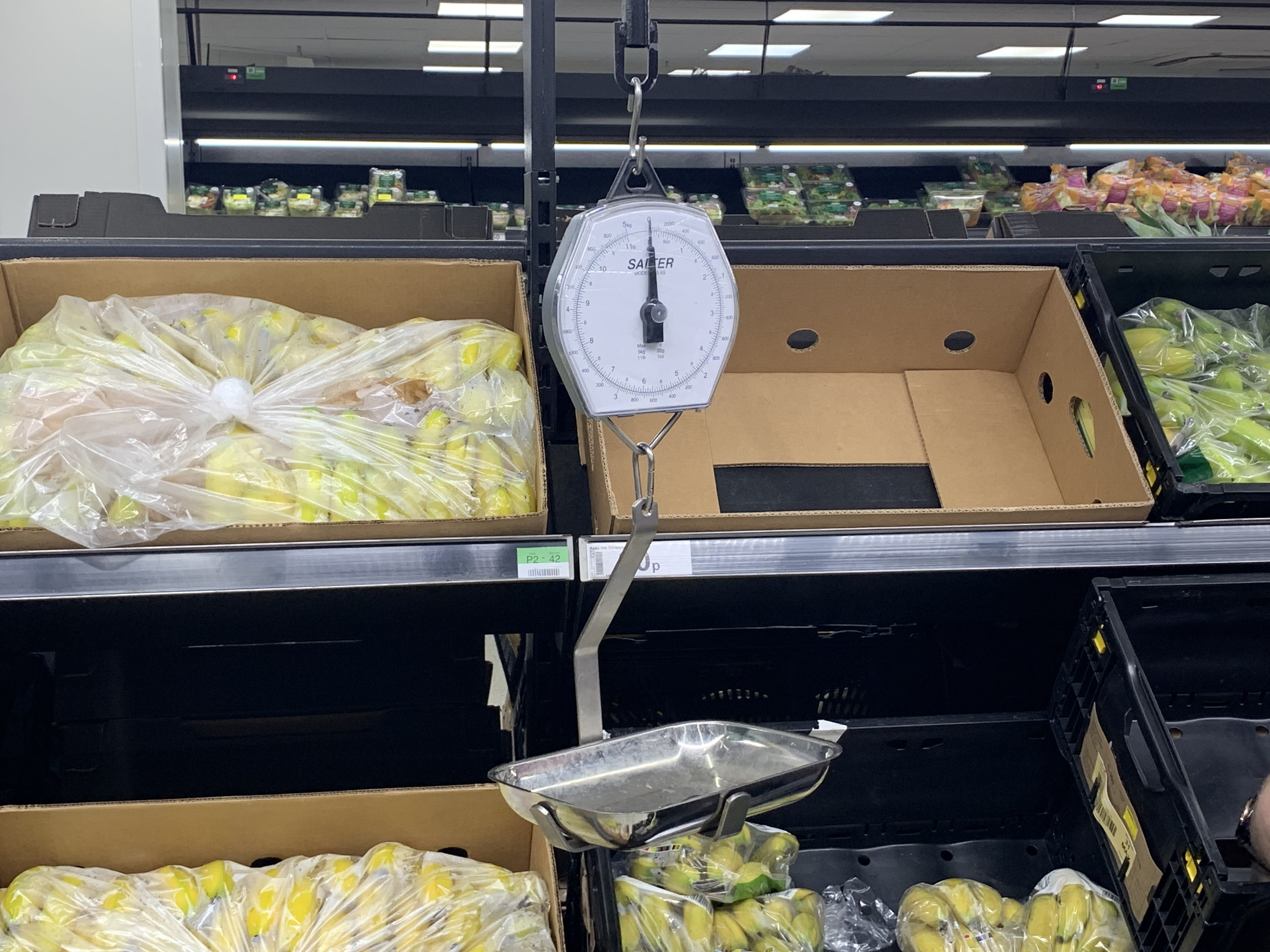
Scales used to measure the weight of fruit in a supermarket

Weighing scale in use in Tokyo

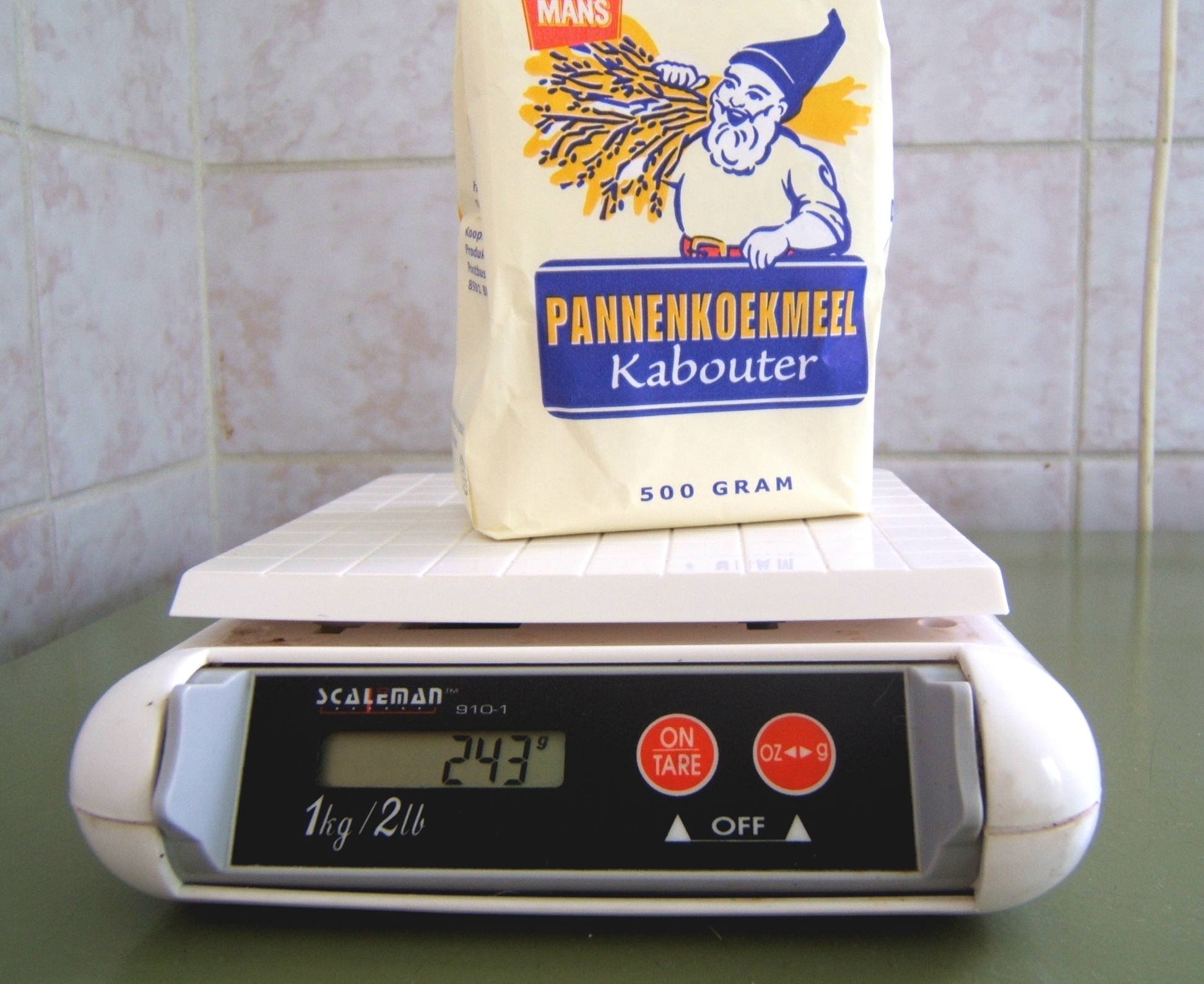
Digital kitchen scale, a strain gauge scale

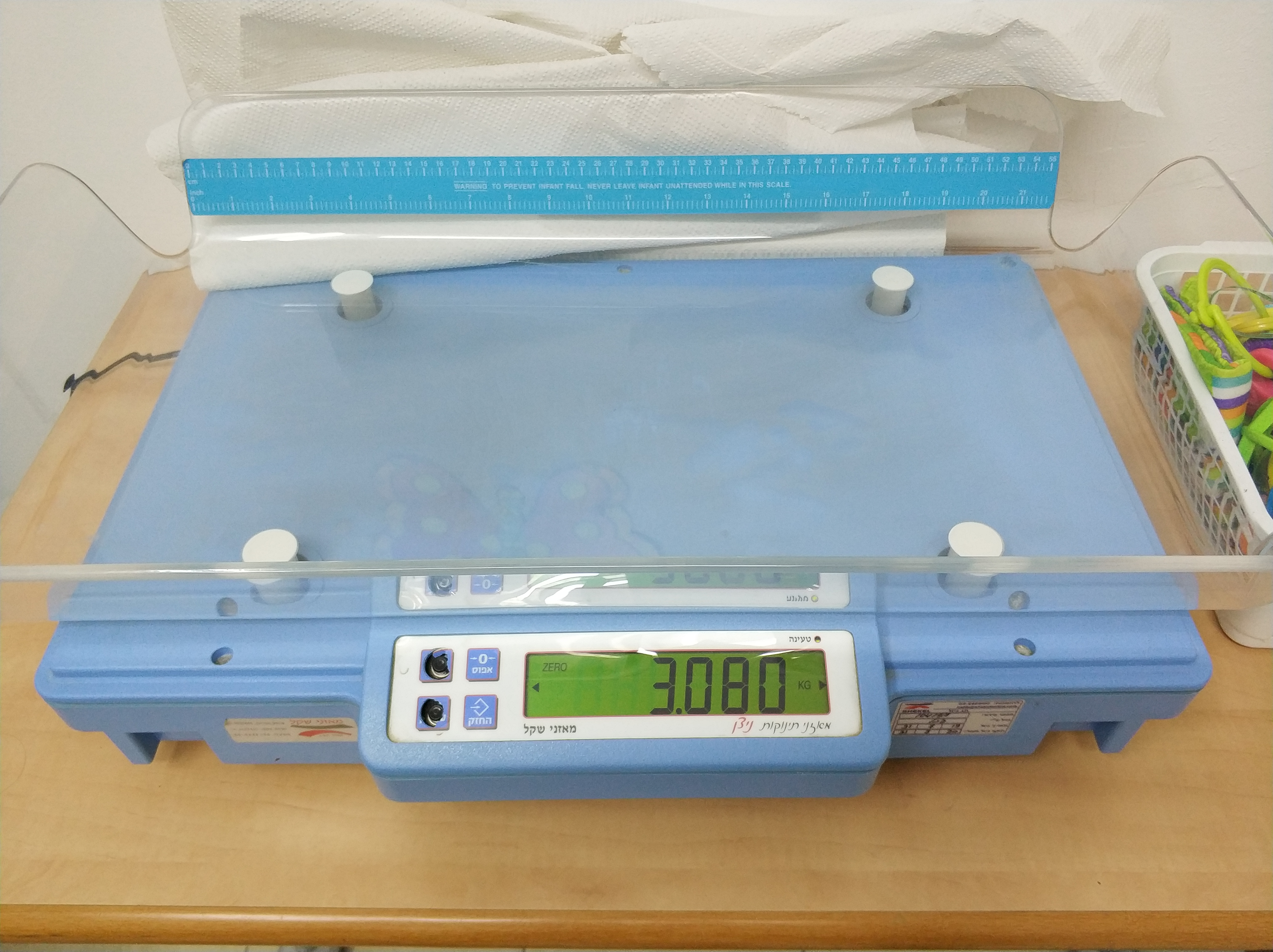
Weighing scale for a baby includes a ruler for height measurement

A scale or balance is a device used to measure weight or mass. These are also known as mass scales, weight scales, mass balances, massometers, and weight balances.

The traditional scale consists of two plates or bowls suspended at equal distances from a fulcrum. One plate holds an object of unknown mass (or weight), while objects of known mass or weight, called weights, are added to the other plate until mechanical equilibrium is achieved and the plates level off, which happens when the masses on the two plates are equal. The perfect scale rests at neutral. A spring scale will make use of a spring of known stiffness to determine mass (or weight). Suspending a certain mass will extend the spring by a certain amount depending on the spring's stiffness (or spring constant). The heavier the object, the more the spring stretches, as described in Hooke's law. Other types of scales making use of different physical principles also exist.

Some scales can be calibrated to read in units of force (weight) such as newtons instead of units of mass such as kilograms. Scales and balances are widely used in commerce, as many products are sold and packaged by mass.

== Pan balance ==
=== History ===
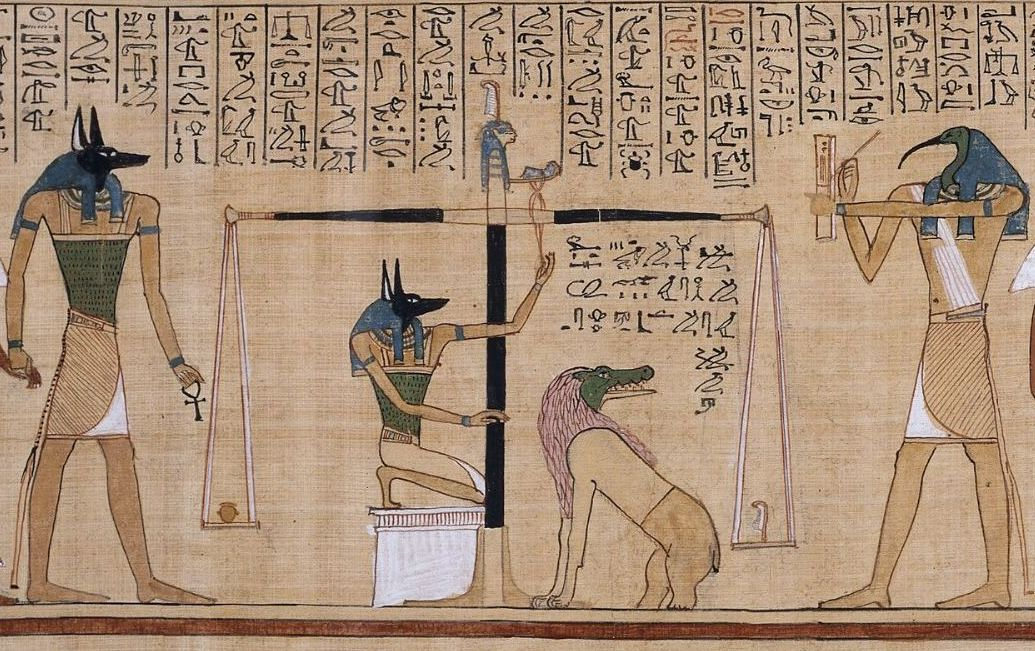
The Ancient Egyptian Book of the Dead depicts a scene in which a scribe's heart is weighed against the feather of truth.

The balance scale is such a simple device that its usage likely far predates the evidence. What has allowed archaeologists to link artifacts to weighing scales are the stones for determining absolute mass. The balance scale itself was probably used to determine relative mass long before absolute mass.

The oldest attested evidence for the existence of weighing scales dates to the Fourth Dynasty of Egypt, with deben balance weights, from the reign of Sneferu (c. 2600 BC) excavated, though earlier usage has been proposed. Carved stones bearing marks denoting mass and the Egyptian hieroglyphic symbol for gold have been discovered, which suggests that Egyptian merchants had been using an established system of mass measurement to catalog gold shipments or gold mine yields. Although no actual scales from this era have survived, many sets of weighing stones as well as murals depicting the use of balance scales suggest widespread usage.

Examples, dating c. 2400–1800 BC, have also been found in the Indus River valley. Uniform, polished stone cubes discovered in early settlements were probably used as mass-setting stones in balance scales. Although the cubes bear no markings, their masses are multiples of a common denominator. The cubes are made of many different kinds of stones with varying densities. Clearly their mass, not their size or other characteristics, was a factor in sculpting these cubes.

In China, the earliest weighing balance excavated was from a tomb of the state of Chu of the Chinese Warring States period dating back to the 3rd to 4th century BC in Mount Zuojiagong near Changsha, Hunan. The balance was made of wood and used bronze masses.

Variations on the balance scale, including devices like the cheap and inaccurate bismar (unequal-armed scales), began to see common usage by c. 400 BC by many small merchants and their customers. A plethora of scale varieties each boasting advantages and improvements over one another appear throughout recorded history, with such great inventors as Leonardo da Vinci lending a personal hand in their development.

Even with all the advances in weighing scale design and development, all scales until the seventeenth century AD were variations on the balance scale. The standardization of the weights used – and ensuring traders used the correct weights – was a considerable preoccupation of governments throughout this time.

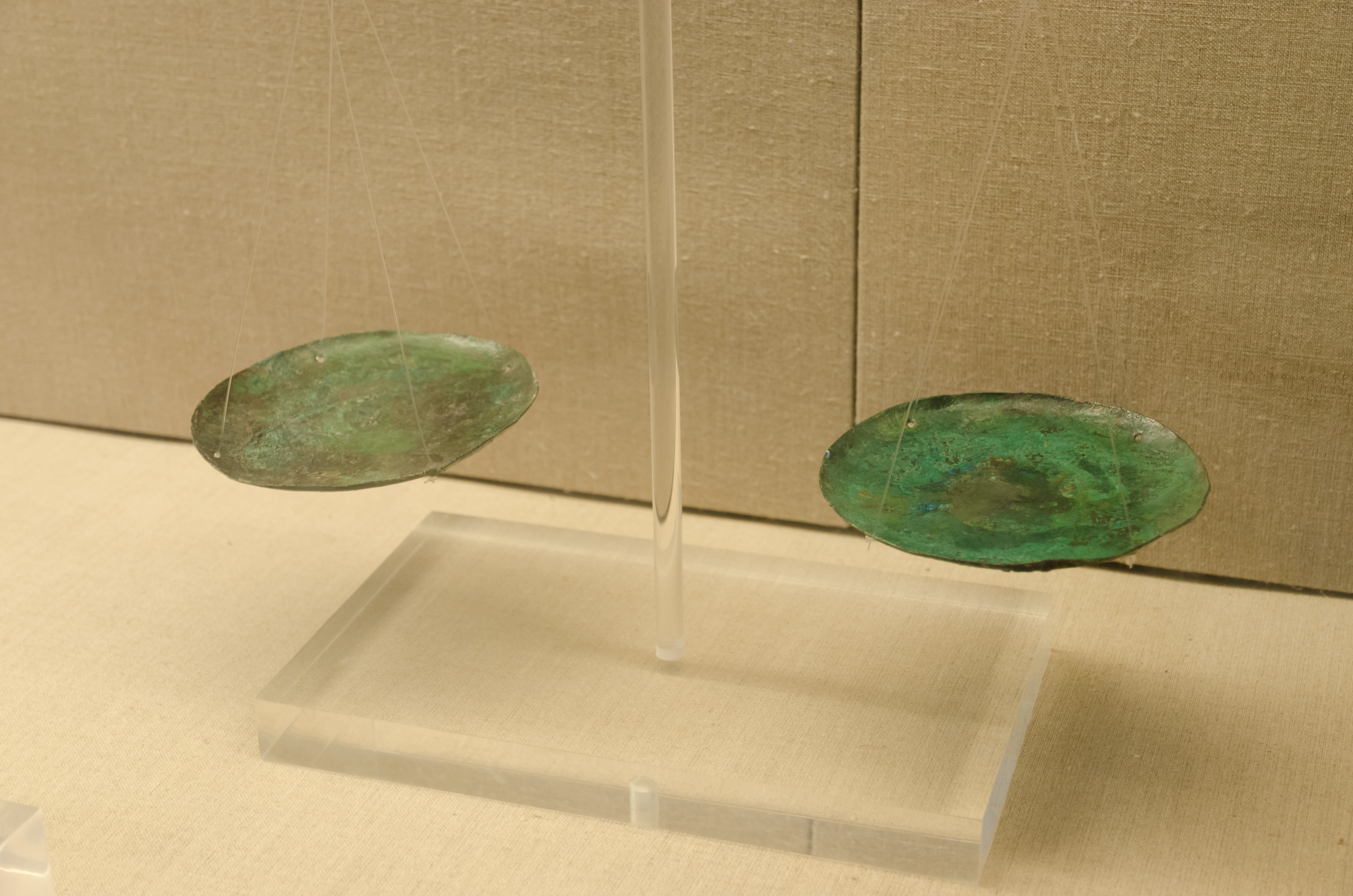
Weighing dishes from the island of Thera, Minoan civilization, 2000–1500 BC

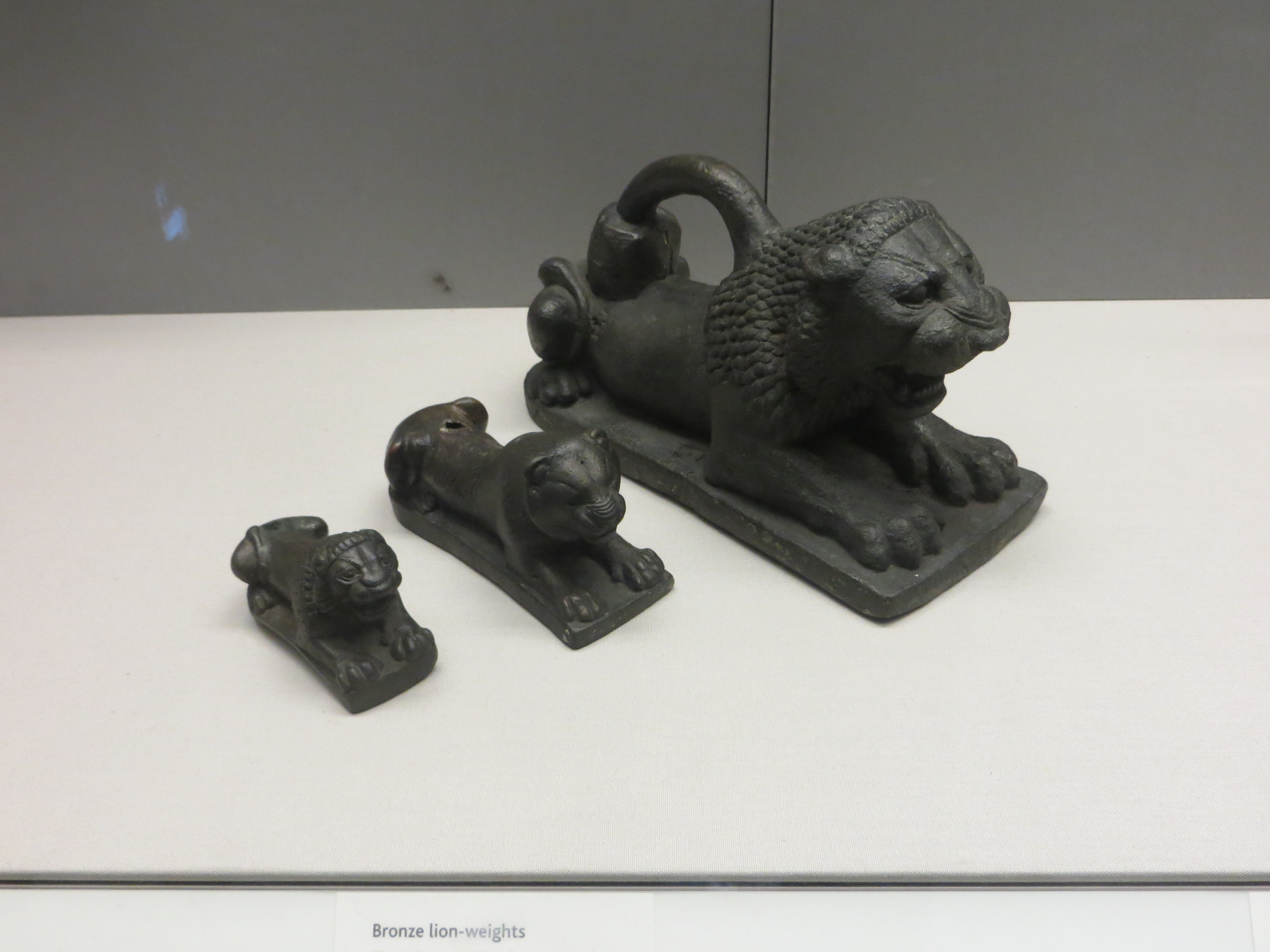
Assyrian lion weights (8th century BC) in the British Museum

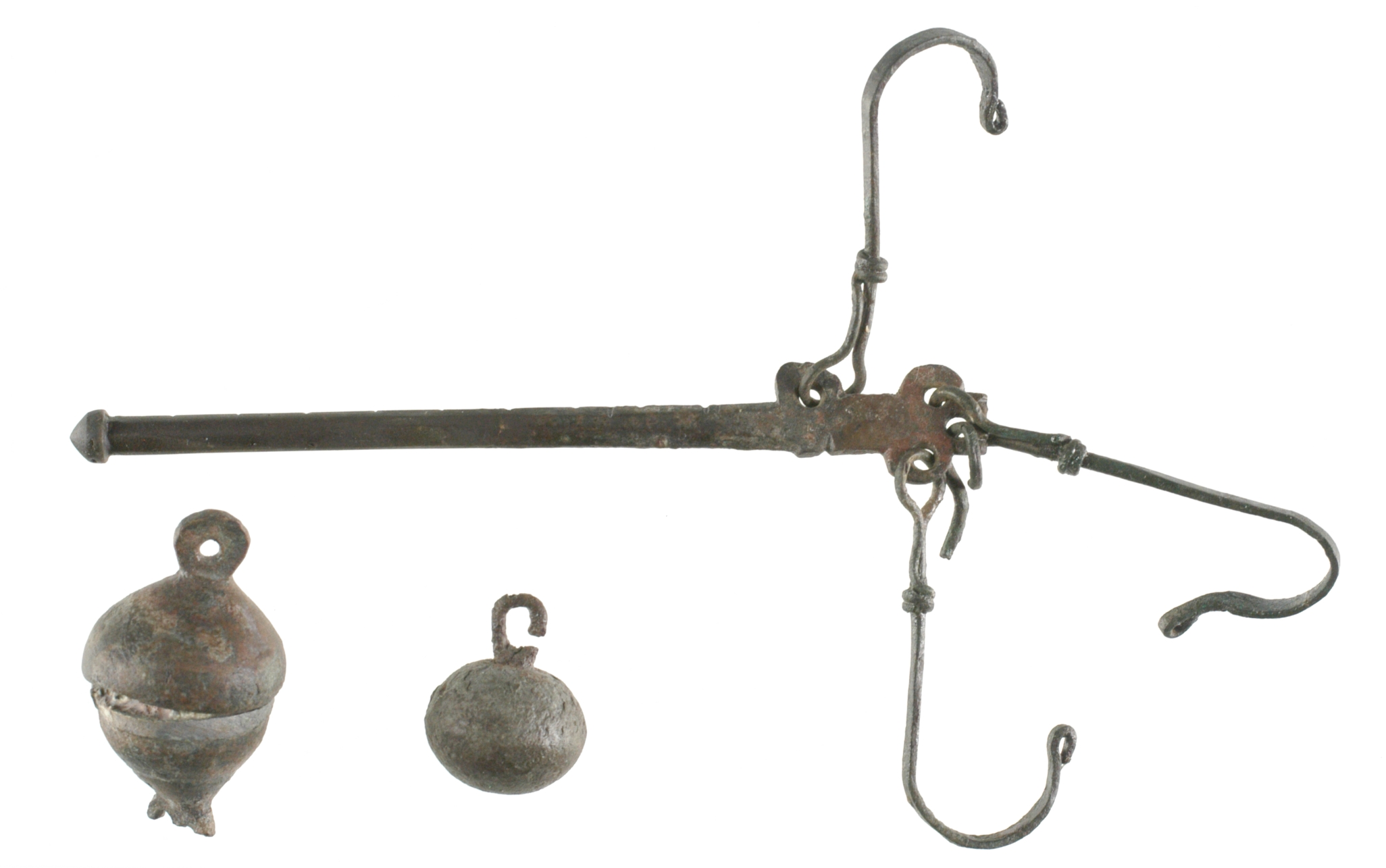
Roman steelyard balance with two bronze weights, 50–200 AD, Gallo-Roman Museum, Tongeren, Belgium

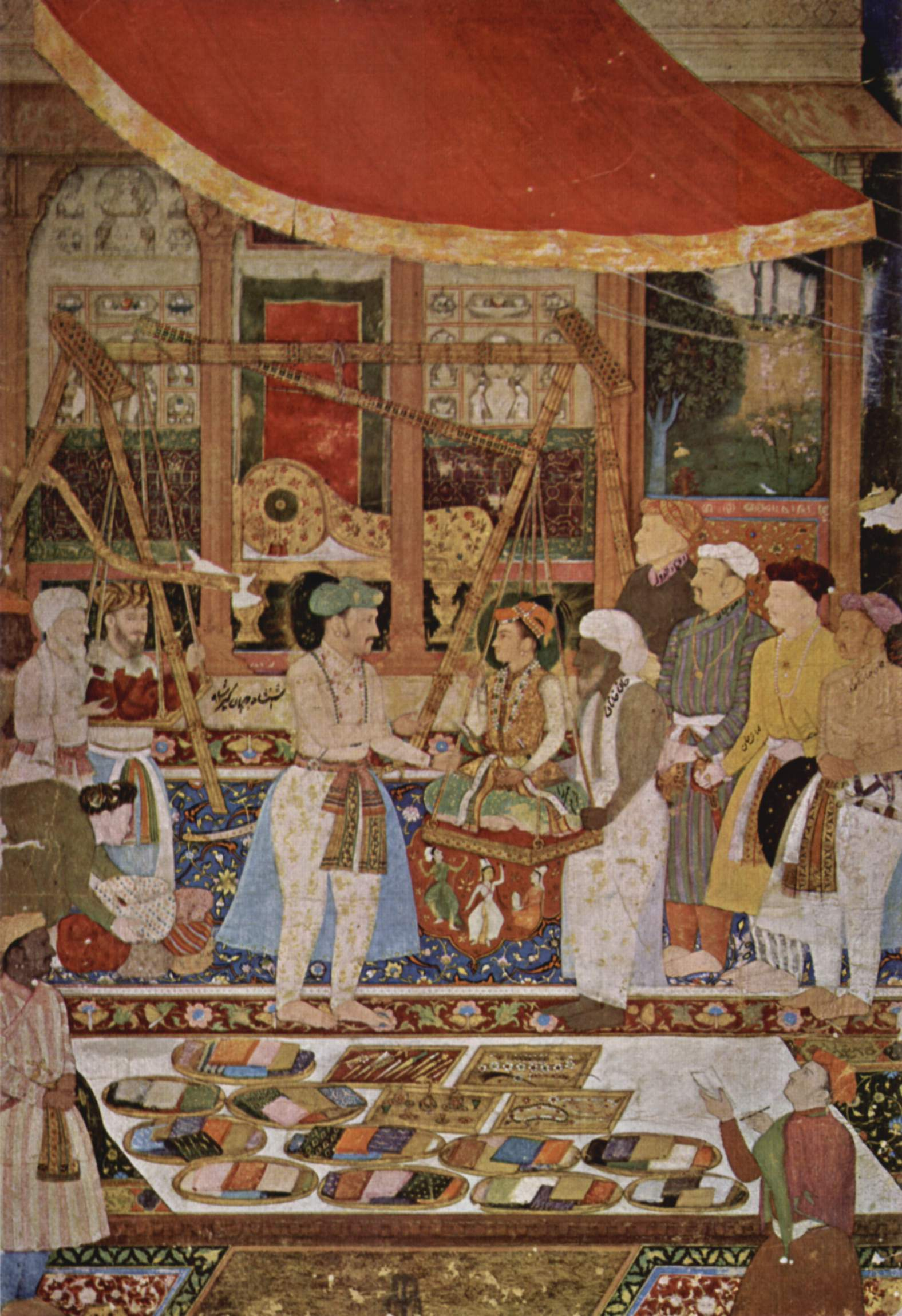
Emperor Jahangir (reigned 1605–1627) weighing his son Shah Jahan on a weighing scale by artist Manohar (AD 1615, Mughal dynasty, India)

The original form of a balance consisted of a beam with a fulcrum at its center. For highest accuracy, the fulcrum would consist of a sharp V-shaped pivot seated in a shallower V-shaped bearing. To determine the mass of the object, a combination of reference masses was hung on one end of the beam while the object of unknown mass was hung on the other end (see balance and steelyard balance). For high precision work, such as empirical chemistry, the center beam balance is still one of the most accurate technologies available, and is commonly used for calibrating test masses.

However, bronze fragments discovered in central Germany and Italy had been used during the Bronze Age as an early form of currency. In the same time period, merchants had used standard weights of equivalent value between 8 and 10.5 grams from Great Britain to Mesopotamia.

=== Mechanical balances ===
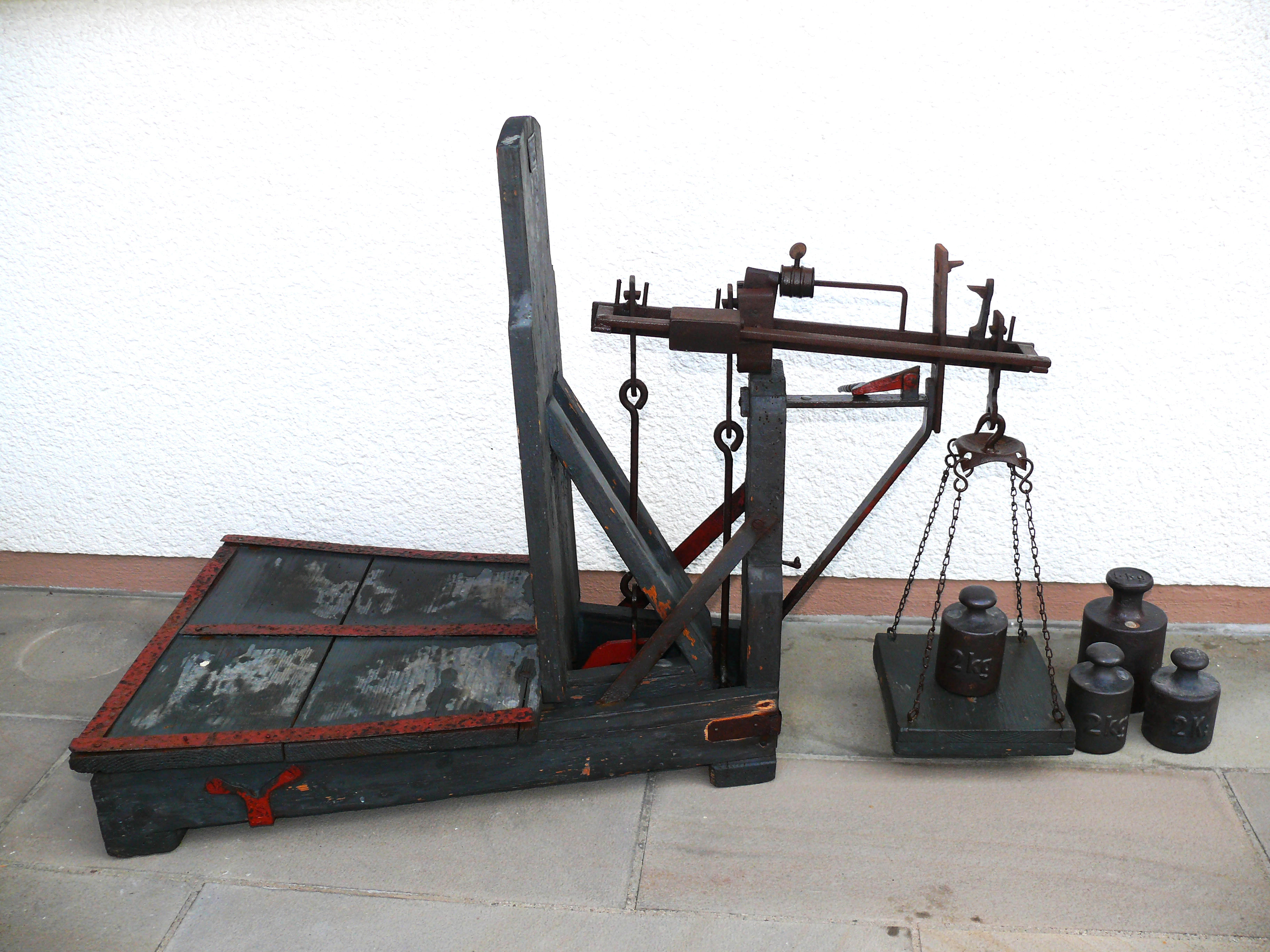
Old decimal balance

The balance (also balance scale, beam balance and laboratory balance) was the first mass measuring instrument invented. In its traditional form, it consists of a pivoted horizontal lever with arms of equal length – the beam or tron – and a weighing pan suspended from each arm (hence the plural name "scales" for a weighing instrument). The unknown mass is placed in one pan and standard masses are added to the other pan until the beam is as close to equilibrium as possible. In precision balances, a more accurate determination of the mass is given by the position of a sliding mass moved along a graduated scale. A decimal balance uses the lever in which the arm for weights is 10 times longer than the arm for weighted objects, so that much lighter weights may be used to weigh heavy object. Similarly a centesimal balance uses arms in ratio 1:100.

For a simple pan balance to be in equilibrium, the fulcrum must be offset from the lever arm. When this is the case, the higher arm gains a mechanical advantage over the lower because its horizontal separation from the fulcrum is greater.

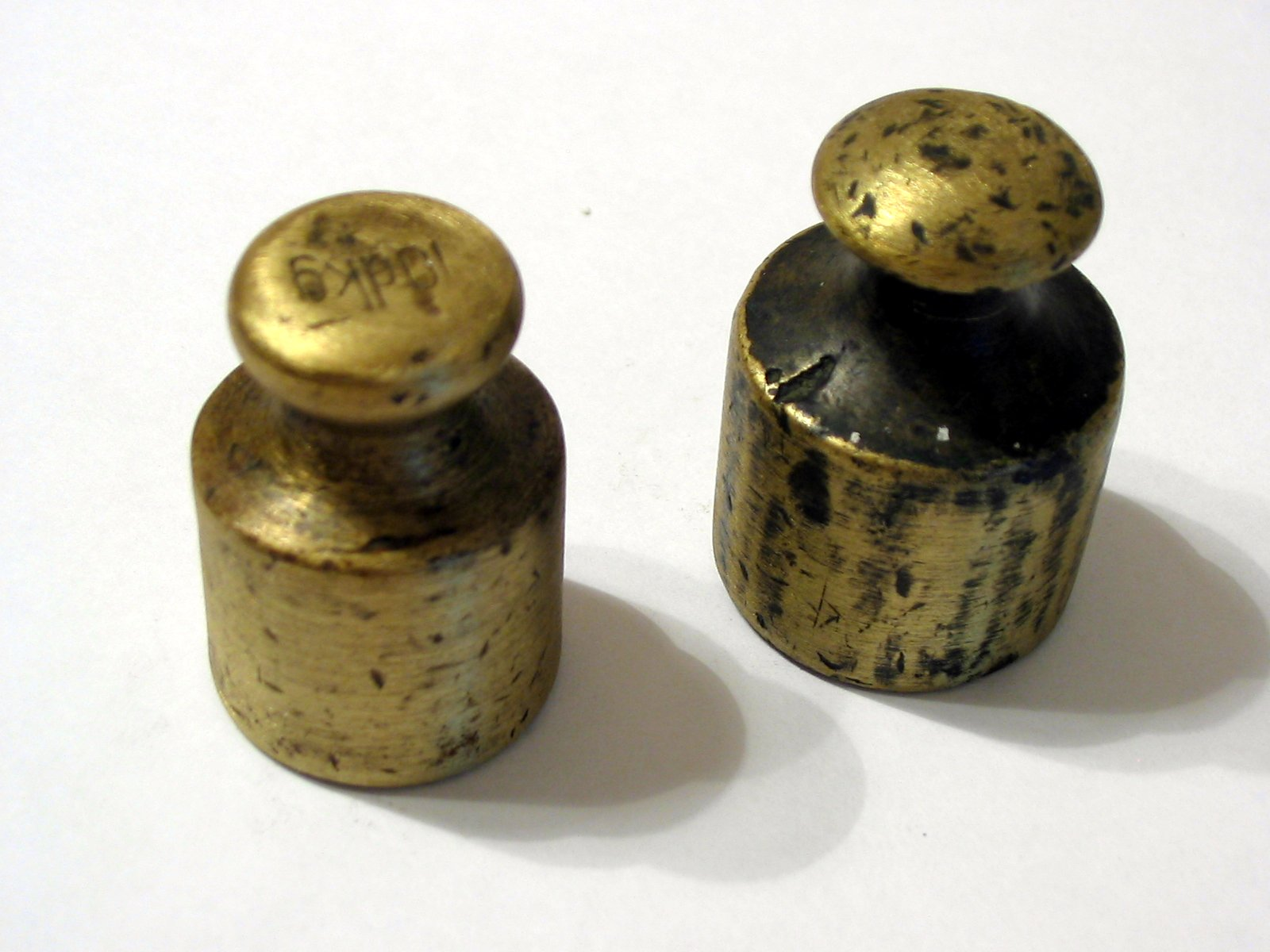
Two 10-decagram masses

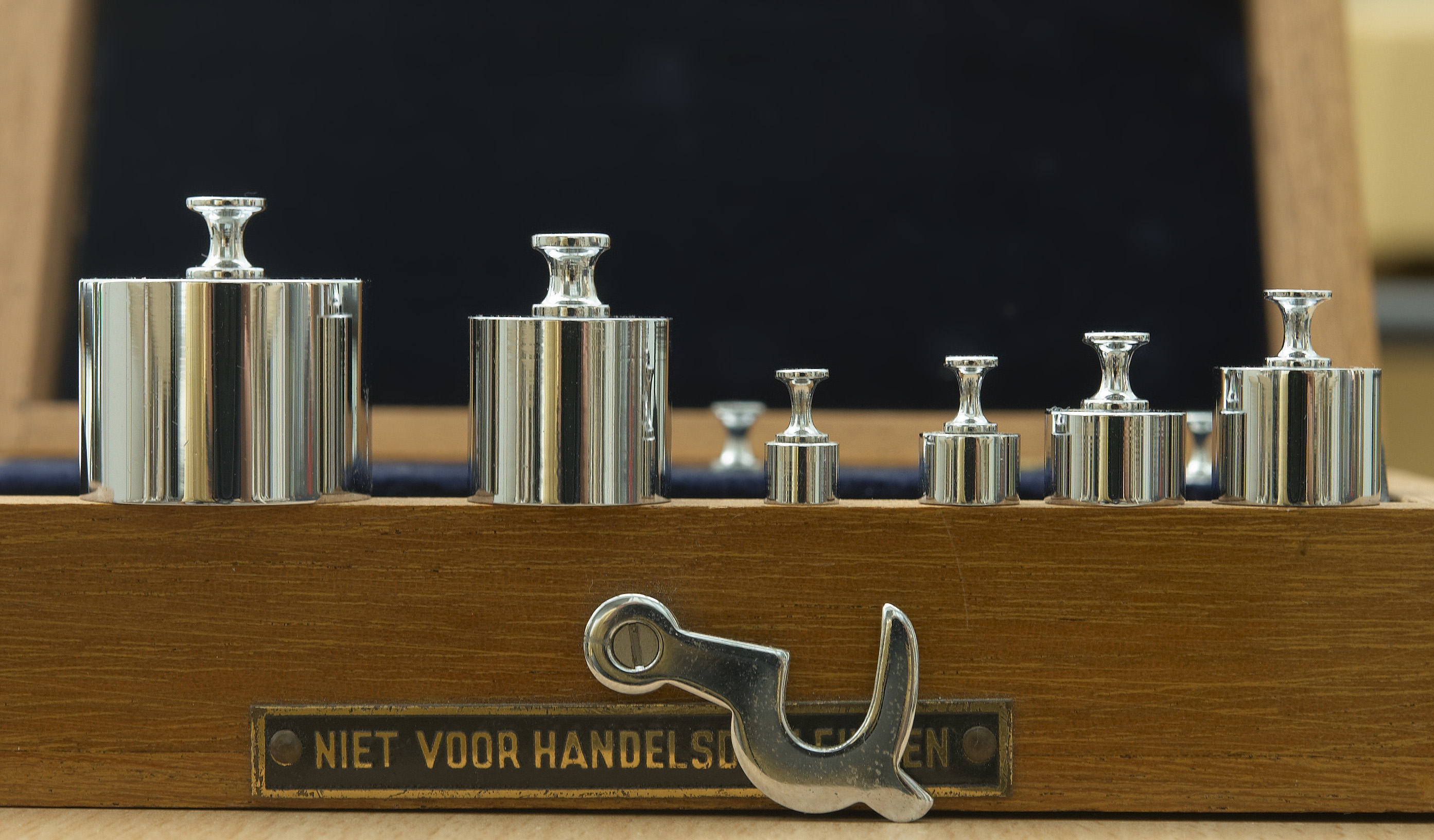
Masses of 50, 20, 1, 2, 5 and 10 grams

Unlike spring-based scales, balances are used for the precision measurement of mass as their accuracy is not affected by variations in the local gravitational field. (On Earth, for example, these can amount to ±0.5% between locations.) A change in the strength of the gravitational field caused by moving the balance does not change the measured mass, because the moments of force on either side of the center balanced beam are affected equally. A center beam balance will render an accurate measurement of mass at any location experiencing a constant gravity or acceleration.

Very precise measurements are achieved by ensuring that the balance's fulcrum is essentially friction-free (a knife edge is the traditional solution), by attaching a pointer to the beam which amplifies any deviation from a balance position; and finally by using the lever principle, which allows fractional masses to be applied by movement of a small mass along the measuring arm of the beam, as described above. For greatest accuracy, there needs to be an allowance for the buoyancy in air, whose effect depends on the densities of the masses involved.

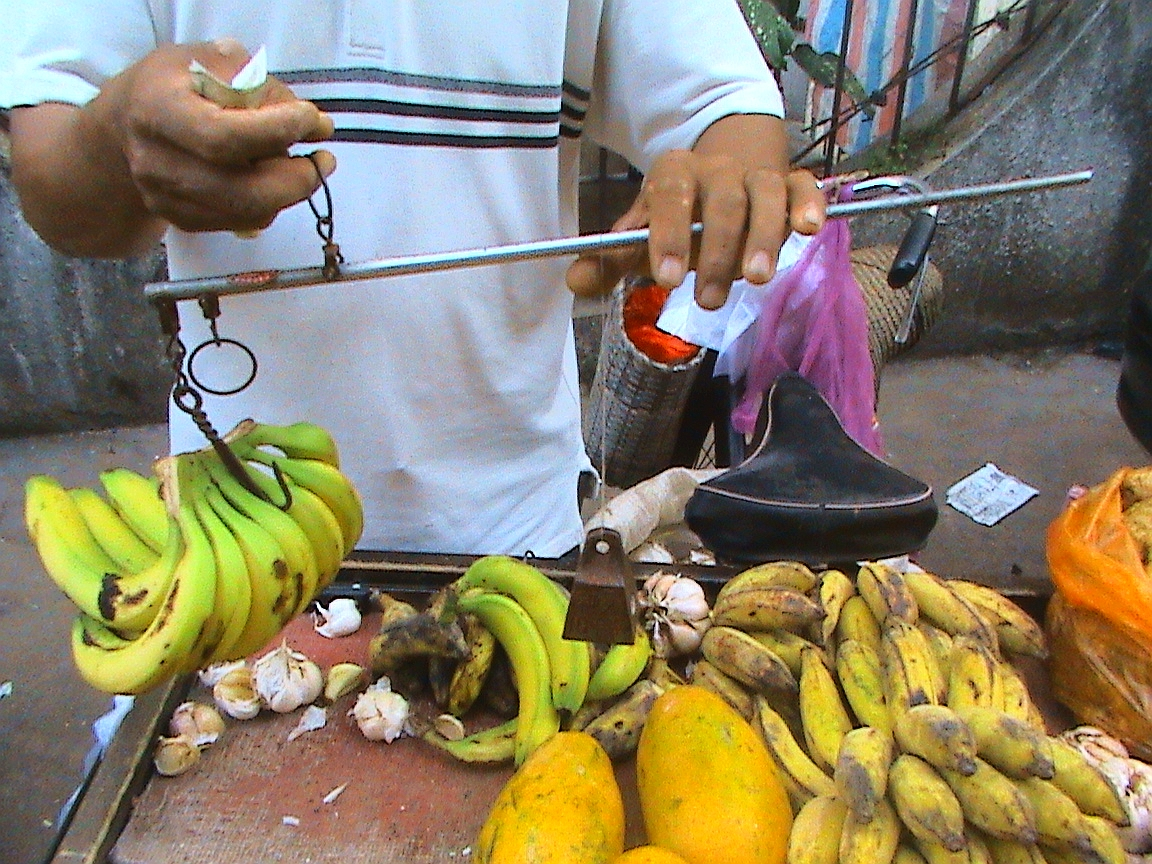
Aluminum, mass-produced balance scale (steelyard balance) sold and used throughout China: the scale can be inverted and held by the larger ring beneath the user's right hand to produce greater leverage for heavier loads (Hainan, China, 2011)

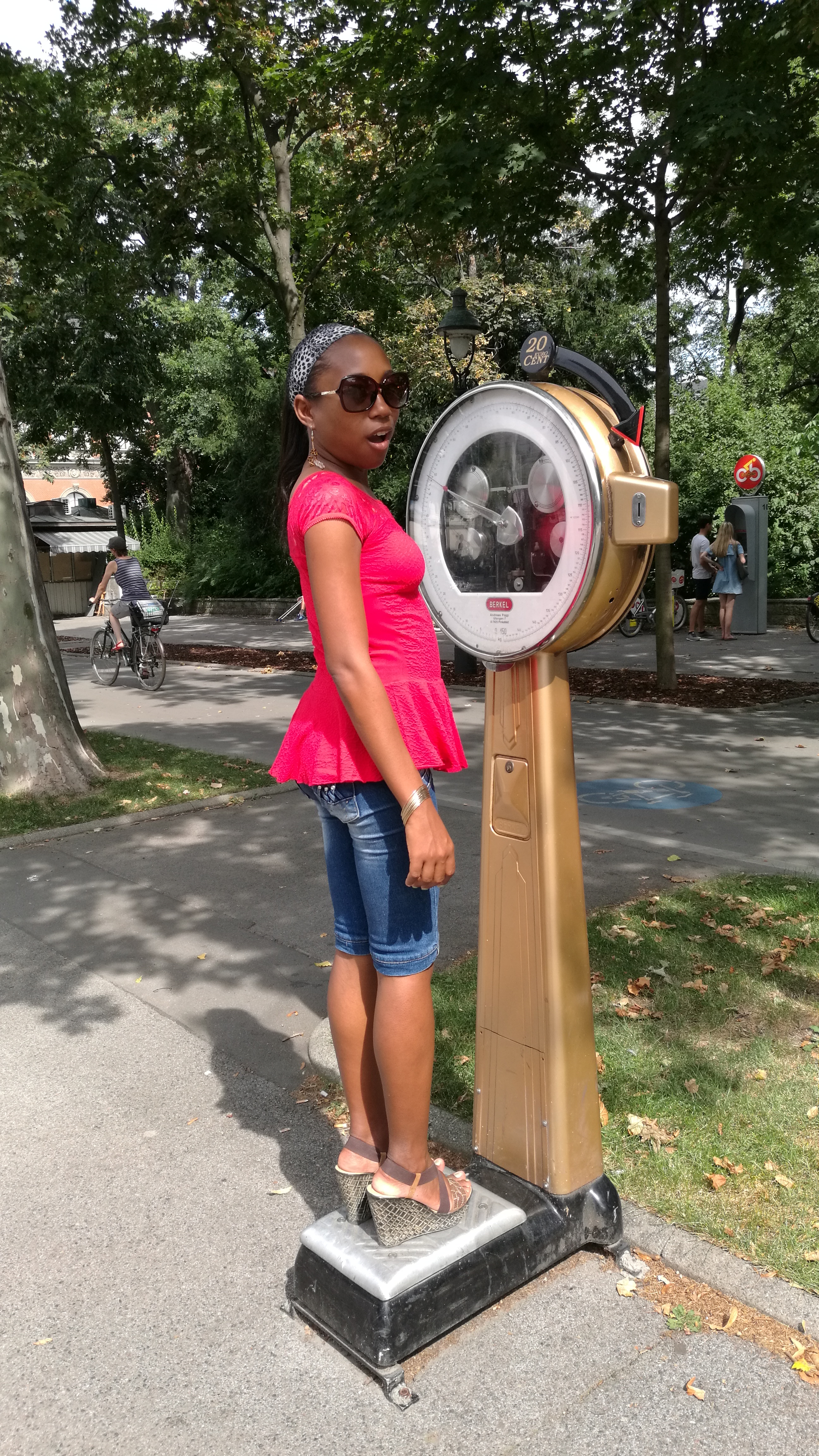
Woman on a public weighing scale, Vienna, Austria, 2016

To reduce the need for large reference masses, an off-center beam can be used. A balance with an off-center beam can be almost as accurate as a scale with a center beam, but the off-center beam requires special reference masses and cannot be intrinsically checked for accuracy by simply swapping the contents of the pans as a center-beam balance can. To reduce the need for small graduated reference masses, a sliding weight called a poise can be installed so that it can be positioned along a calibrated scale. A poise adds further intricacies to the calibration procedure, since the exact mass of the poise must be adjusted to the exact lever ratio of the beam.

For greater convenience in placing large and awkward loads, a platform can be floated on a cantilever beam system which brings the proportional force to a noseiron bearing; this pulls on a stilyard rod to transmit the reduced force to a conveniently sized beam.

One still sees this design in portable beam balances of 500 kg capacity which are commonly used in harsh environments without electricity, as well as in the lighter duty mechanical bathroom scale (which actually uses a spring scale, internally). The additional pivots and bearings all reduce the accuracy and complicate calibration; the float system must be corrected for corner errors before the span is corrected by adjusting the balance beam and poise.

==== Roberval balance ====
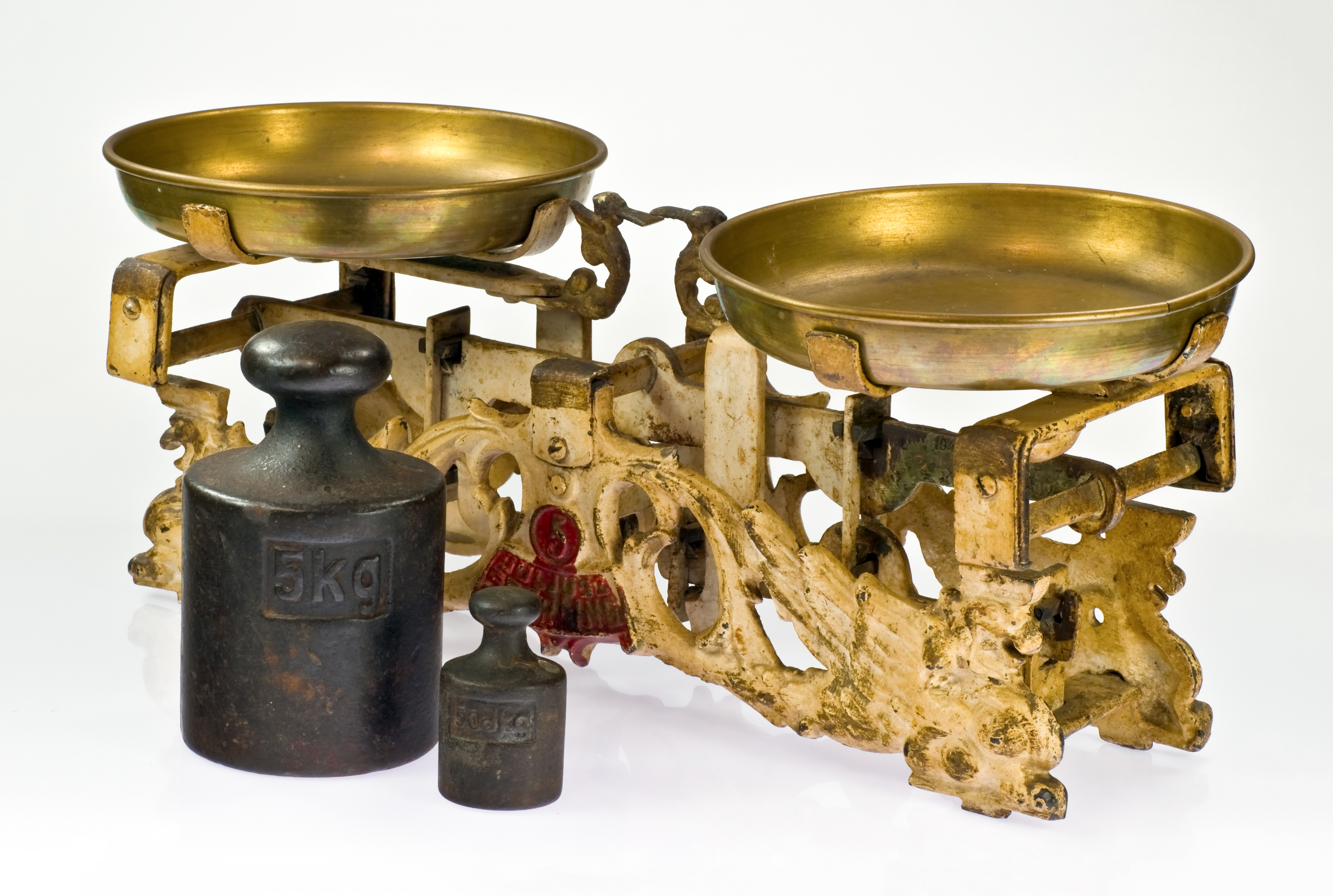
A Roberval balance. The pivots of the parallelogram understructure makes it insensitive to load positioning away from center, so improves its accuracy, and ease of use.

In 1669 the Frenchman Gilles Personne de Roberval presented a new kind of balance scale to the French Academy of Sciences. This scale consisted of a pair of vertical columns separated by a pair of equal-length arms and pivoting in the center of each arm from a central vertical column, creating a parallelogram. From the side of each vertical column a peg extended. To the amazement of observers, no matter where Roberval hung two equal weight along the peg, the scale still balanced. In this sense, the scale was revolutionary: it evolved into the more-commonly encountered form consisting of two pans placed on vertical column located above the fulcrum and the parallelogram below them. The advantage of the Roberval design is that no matter where equal weights are placed in the pans, the scale will still balance.

Further developments have included a "gear balance" in which the parallelogram is replaced by any odd number of interlocking gears greater than one, with alternating gears of the same size and with the central gear fixed to a stand and the outside gears fixed to pans, as well as the "sprocket gear balance" consisting of a bicycle-type chain looped around an odd number of sprockets with the central one fixed and the outermost two free to pivot and attached to a pan.

Because it has more moving joints which add friction, the Roberval balance is consistently less accurate than the traditional beam balance, but for many purposes this is compensated for by its usability.

==== Torsion balance ====
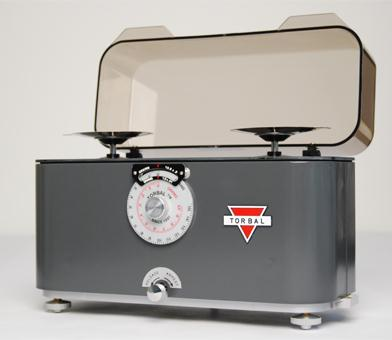
Torsion balance scale made by Torbal

The torsion balance is one of the most mechanically accurate of analog balances. Pharmacy schools still teach how to use torsion balances in the U.S. It utilizes pans like a traditional balance that lie on top of a mechanical chamber which bases measurements on the amount of twisting of a wire or fiber inside the chamber. The scale must still use a calibration weight to compare against, and can weigh objects greater than 120 mg and come within a margin of error +/- 7 mg. Many microbalances and ultra-microbalances that weigh fractional gram values are torsion balances. A common fiber type is quartz crystal.

=== Electronic devices ===
==== Microbalance ====
A microbalance (also called an ultramicrobalance, or nanobalance) is an instrument capable of making precise measurements of the mass of objects of relatively small mass: on the order of a million parts of a gram and below.

==== Analytical balance ====
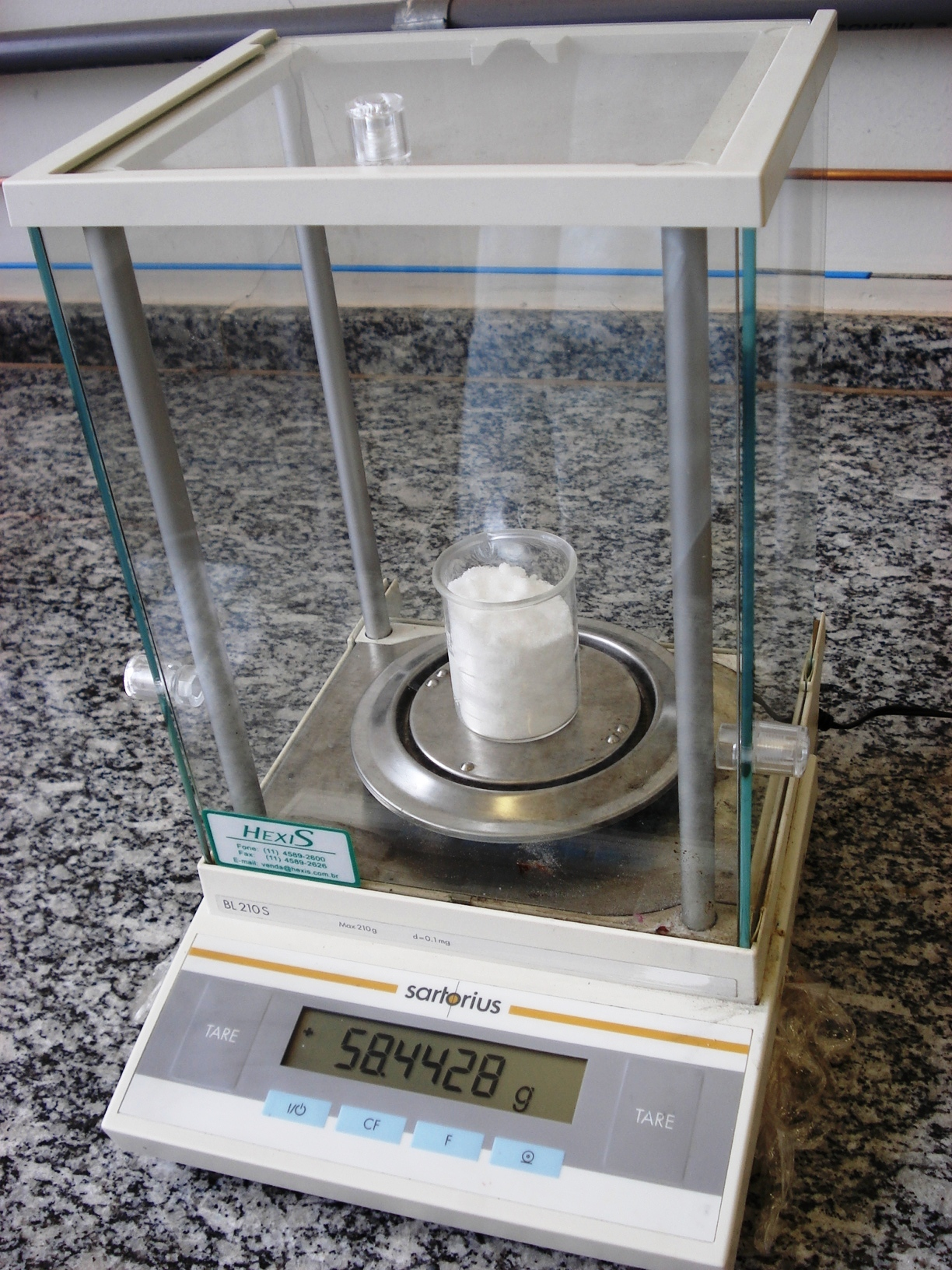
Analytical balance

An analytical balance is a class of balance designed to measure small mass in the sub-milligram range. The measuring pan of an analytical balance (0.1 mg or better) is inside a transparent enclosure with doors so that dust does not collect and so any air currents in the room do not affect the balance's operation. This enclosure is often called a draft shield. The use of a mechanically vented balance safety enclosure, which has uniquely designed acrylic airfoils, allows a smooth turbulence-free airflow that prevents balance fluctuation and the measure of mass down to 1 μg without fluctuations or loss of product. Also, the sample must be at room temperature to prevent natural convection from forming air currents inside the enclosure from causing an error in reading. Single-pan mechanical substitution balances maintain consistent response throughout the useful capacity, which is achieved by maintaining a constant load on the balance beam and thus the fulcrum by subtracting mass on the same side of the beam to which the sample is added.

Electronic analytical scales measure the force needed to counter the mass being measured rather than using actual masses. As such they must have calibration adjustments made to compensate for gravitational differences. They use an electromagnet to generate a force to counter the sample being measured and output the result by measuring the force needed to achieve balance. Such a measurement device is called an electromagnetic force restoration sensor.

==== Pendulum balance scales ====
Pendulum type scales do not use springs. These designs use pendulums and operate as a balance that is unaffected by differences in gravity. An example of application of this design are scales made by the Toledo Scale Company.

==== Programmable scales ====
A programmable scale has a programmable logic controller in it, allowing it to be programmed for various applications such as batching, labeling, filling (with check weight function), truck scales, and more.

Another important function is counting, e. g. used to count small parts in larger quantities during the annual stock taking. Counting scales (which can also do just weighing) can range from mg to tonnes.

=== Symbolism ===
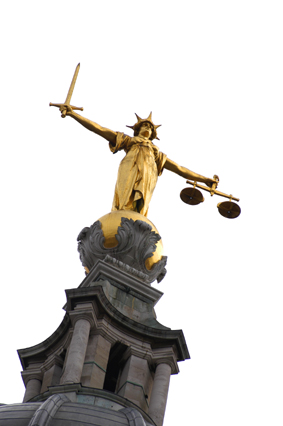
"Lady Justice" holding a 2-pan balance beam scale, and a sword: Statue of Justice, Central Criminal Court, London, UK

The scales (specifically, a two-pan, beam balance) are one of the traditional symbols of justice, as wielded by statues of Lady Justice. This corresponds to the use in a metaphor of matters being "held in the balance". It has its origins in ancient Egypt.

Scales also are widely used as a symbol of finance, commerce, or trade, in which they have played a traditional, vital role since ancient times. For instance, balance scales are depicted in the seal of the U.S. Department of the Treasury and the Federal Trade Commission.

Seal of the U.S. Department of the Treasury

Seal of the U.S. Federal Trade Commission

Scales are also the symbol for the astrological sign Libra.

Scales (specifically, a two-pan, beam balance in a state of equal balance) are the traditional symbol of Pyrrhonism indicating the equal balance of arguments used in inducing epoche.

== Force-measuring (weight) scales ==
=== History ===
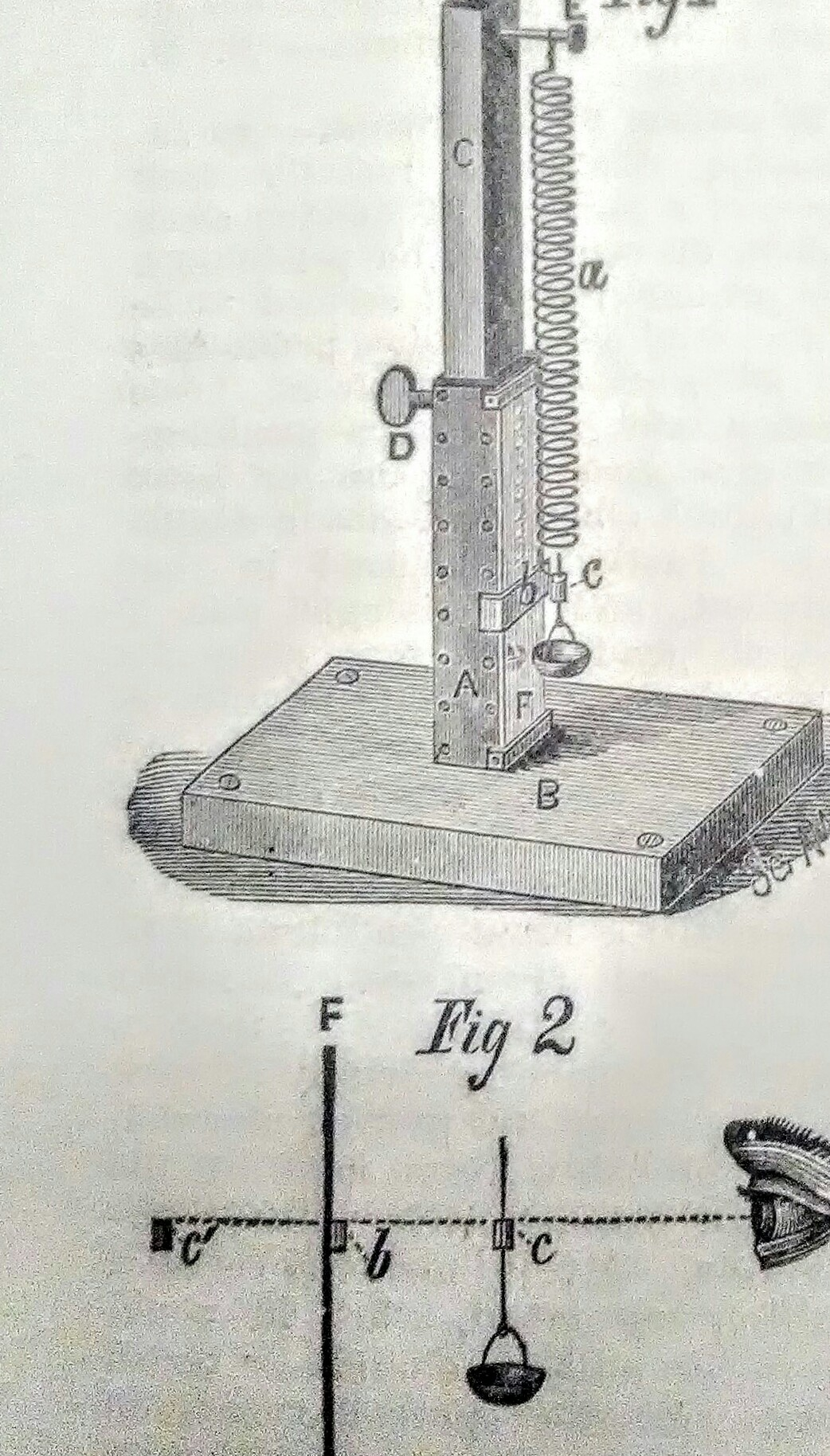
A simple balance from the 19th century

Although records dating to the 1700s refer to spring scales for measuring mass, the earliest design for such a device dates to 1770 and credits Richard Salter, an early scale-maker. Spring scales came into wide usage in the United Kingdom after 1840 when R. W. Winfield developed the candlestick scale for weighing letters and packages, required after the introduction of the Uniform Penny Post. Postal workers could work more quickly with spring scales than balance scales because they could be read instantaneously and did not have to be carefully balanced with each measurement.

By the 1940s, various electronic devices were being attached to these designs to make readings more accurate. Load cells – transducers that convert force to an electrical signal – have their beginnings as early as the late nineteenth century, but it was not until the late twentieth century that their widespread usage became economically and technologically viable.

=== Mechanical scales ===
A mechanical scale or balance is used to describe a weighing device that is used to measure the mass, force exertion, tension, and resistance of an object without the need of a power supply. Types of mechanical scales include decimal balances, spring scales, hanging scales, triple beam balances, and force gauges.

==== Spring scales ====
A spring scale measures mass by reporting the distance that a spring deflects under a load. This contrasts to a balance, which compares the torque on the arm due to a sample weight to the torque on the arm due to a standard reference mass using a horizontal lever. Spring scales measure force, which is the tension force of constraint acting on an object, opposing the local force of gravity. They are usually calibrated so that measured force translates to mass at earth's gravity. The object to be weighed can be simply hung from the spring or set on a pivot and bearing platform.

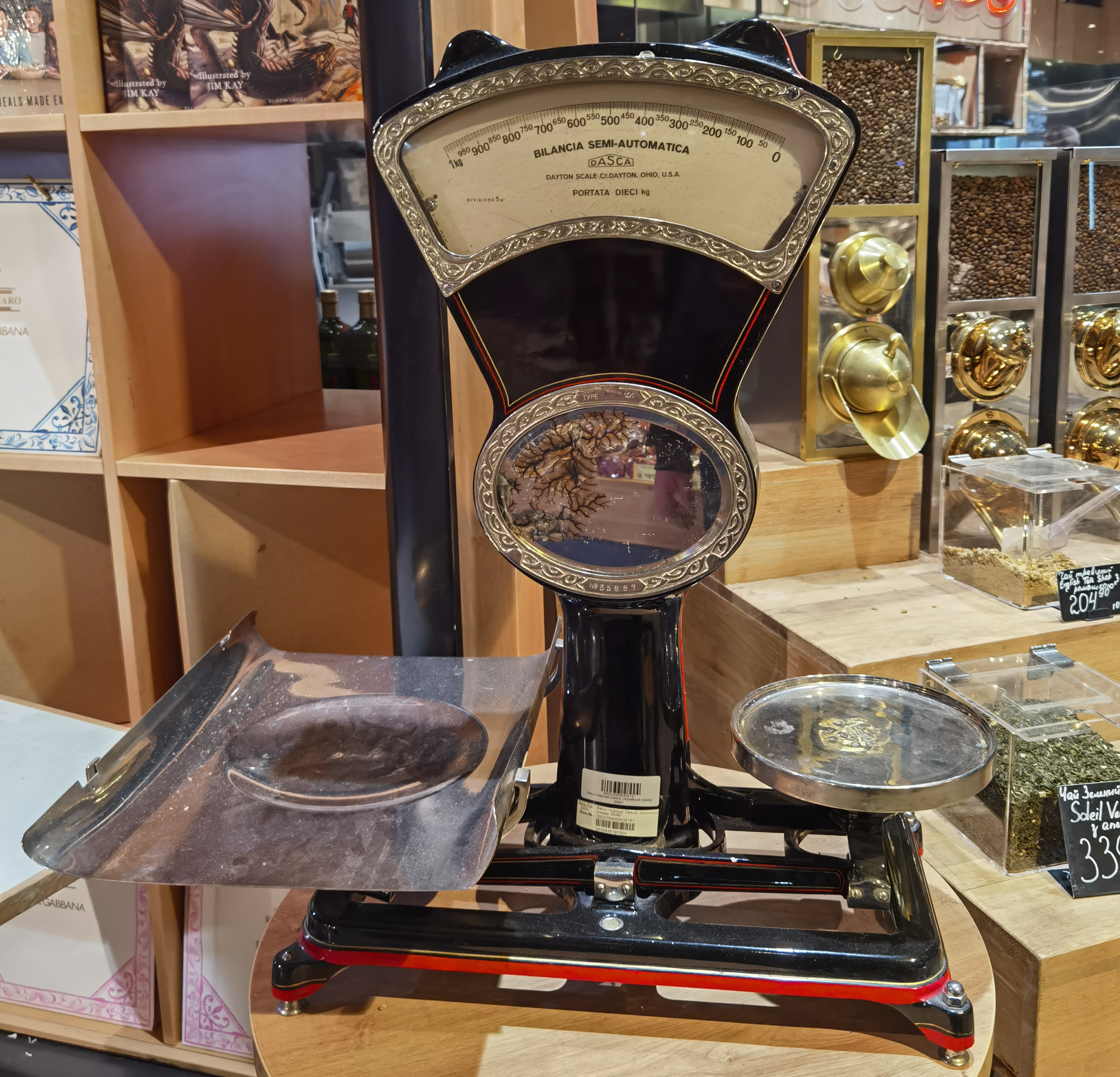
Bilancia Dayton Scale, manufactured approx before 1940.

In a spring scale, the spring either stretches (as in a hanging scale in the produce department of a grocery store) or compresses (as in a simple bathroom scale). By Hooke's law, every spring has a proportionality constant that relates how hard it is pulled to how far it stretches. Weighing scales use a spring with a known spring constant (see Hooke's law) and measure the displacement of the spring by any variety of mechanisms to produce an estimate of the gravitational force applied by the object. Rack and pinion mechanisms are often used to convert the linear spring motion to a dial reading.

Spring scales have two sources of error that balances do not: the measured mass varies with the strength of the local gravitational force (by as much as 0.5% at different locations on Earth), and the elasticity of the measurement spring can vary slightly with temperature. With proper manufacturing and setup, however, spring scales can be rated as legal for commerce. To remove the temperature error, a commerce-legal spring scale must either have temperature-compensated springs or be used at a fairly constant temperature. To eliminate the effect of gravity variations, a commerce-legal spring scale must be calibrated where it is used.

==== Hydraulic or pneumatic scale ====
It is also common in high-capacity applications such as crane scales to use hydraulic force to sense mass. The test force is applied to a piston or diaphragm and transmitted through hydraulic lines to a dial indicator based on a Bourdon tube or electronic sensor.

=== Domestic weighing scales ===
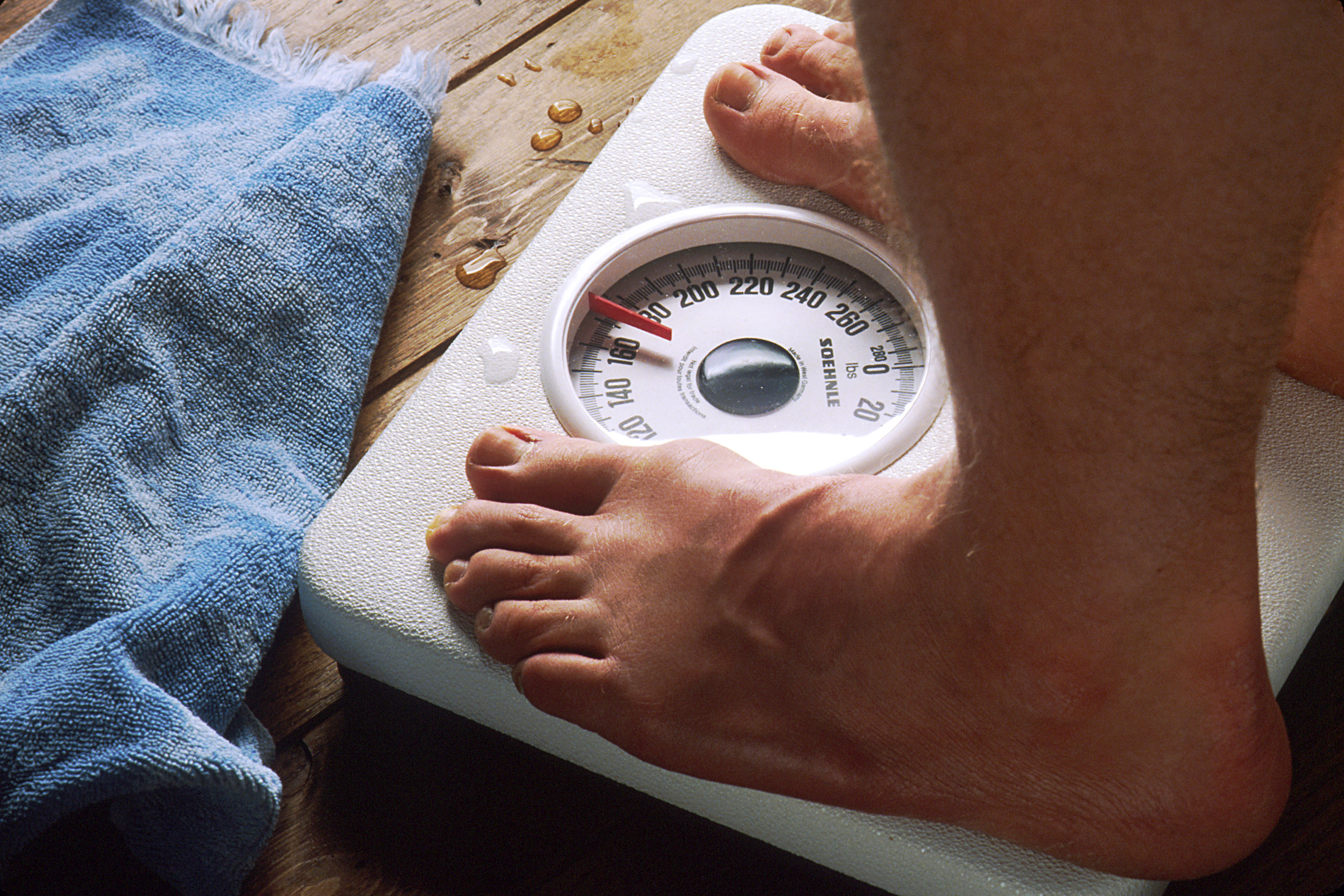
A mechanical bathroom scale. Pressure on the internal springs rotates a disc displaying the user's weight in pounds.

Electronic digital scales display weight as a number, usually on a liquid crystal display (LCD). They are versatile because they may perform calculations on the measurement and transmit it to other digital devices. On a digital scale, the force of the weight causes a spring to deform, and the amount of deformation is measured by one or more transducers called strain gauges. A strain gauge is a conductor whose electrical resistance changes when its length changes. Strain gauges have limited capacity and larger digital scales may use a hydraulic transducer called a load cell instead. A voltage is applied to the device, and the weight causes the current through it to change. The current is converted to a digital number by an analog-to-digital converter, translated by digital logic to the correct units, and displayed on the display. Usually, the device is run by a microprocessor chip.

==== Digital bathroom scale ====
A digital bathroom scale is a scale on the floor which a person stands on. The weight is shown on a digital display. The digital electronics may do more than just display weight, it may calculate body fat, BMI, lean mass, muscle mass, and water ratio. Some modern bathroom scales are wirelessly or cellularly connected and have features like smartphone integration, cloud storage, and fitness tracking. They are usually powered by a button cell, or battery of AA or AAA size.

==== Digital kitchen scale ====
Digital kitchen scales are used for weighing food in a kitchen during cooking. These are usually lightweight and compact.

==== Strain gauge scale ====
In electronic versions of spring scales, the deflection of a beam supporting the unknown mass is measured using a strain gauge, which is a length-sensitive electrical resistance. The capacity of such devices is only limited by the resistance of the beam to deflection. The results from several supporting locations may be added electronically, so this technique is suitable for determining the mass of very heavy objects, such as trucks and rail cars, and is used in a modern weighbridge.

==== Supermarket and other retail scale ====
These scales are used in the modern bakery, grocery, delicatessen, seafood, meat, produce and other perishable goods departments. Supermarket scales can print labels and receipts, mark mass and count, unit price, total price and in some cases tare. Some modern supermarket scales print an RFID tag that can be used to track the item for tampering or returns. In most cases, these types of scales have a sealed calibration so that the reading on the display is correct and cannot be tampered with. In the US, the scales are certified by the National Type Evaluation Program (NTEP), in South Africa by the South African Bureau of Standards, in Australia, they are certified by the National Measurement Institute (NMI) and in the UK by the International Organization of Legal Metrology.

=== Industrial weighing scale ===
An industrial weighing scale is a device that measures the weight or mass of objects in various industries. It can range from small bench scales to large weighbridges, and it can have different features and capacities. Industrial weighing scales are used for quality control, inventory management, and trade purposes.

There are many kinds of industrial weighing scales that are used for different purposes and applications. Some of the common types are:

Weighbridges : A large scale that can weigh trucks, lorries, containers, and other heavy-duty vehicles. They are used in industries like manufacturing, shipping, mining, agriculture, etc.

Container Stacker Scale : A container stacker scale is a specialized weighing system designed for accurately measuring the weight of shipping containers. It is typically integrated into the equipment used for loading and unloading containers, such as container handlers or stacker cranes. Container stacker scales provide real-time weight measurements, allowing logistics professionals to ensure that each container is loaded within the specified weight limits. Container stacker scales are used in industries like ports, shipping, and logistics

Forklift scale : A forklift scale is a weighing system that is built into a forklift truck. It allows for the weighing of loads while they are being lifted and transported by the forklift. This eliminates the need for separate weighing operations and reduces the time and labor required for material handling operations. Forklift scales are used in various industries, such as manufacturing, logistics, and shipping.

Material Handler Scale : A Material Handler Scale is a weighing system that is integrated into a material handler machine, such as a grapple or a magnet. It allows for the accurate and efficient weighing of materials while they are being moved, unloaded, or loaded. A Material Handler Scale can be used in various industries, such as scrap, recycling, waste, and port and harbor. A Material Handler Scale can also transfer the weighing information to a cloud service or an ERP system for real-time monitoring and management of material flow.

A pallet jack scale is a device that combines a pallet jack and a weighing scale. It allows you to weigh and move pallets at the same time, saving time and labor. Pallet jack scales are used in various industries, such as manufacturing, logistics, and shipping.

Crane Scale : A crane scale is a device that measures the weight or mass of objects that are suspended from a crane. It has a hook at the bottom and a large display that allows distant viewing. Crane scales are used for various industrial applications, such as manufacturing, shipping, mining, recycling, and more

Wheel Loader Scale : A wheel loader scale is a system that measures the weight of the materials lifted by a wheel loader, a type of heavy machinery used for moving large amounts of earth, sand, gravel, or other materials. A wheel loader scale can help improve the efficiency and accuracy of loading operations, as well as the inventory management and safety of the industries that use them. A wheel loader scale typically consists of a hydraulic sensor, a display unit, and a data management system. The hydraulic sensor is installed in the wheel loader and detects the pressure changes caused by the load. The display unit shows the weight information to the operator and allows them to set target loads, select products and customers, and export data. The data management system can store, analyze, and transmit the weight data to other devices or platforms.

=== Testing and certification ===
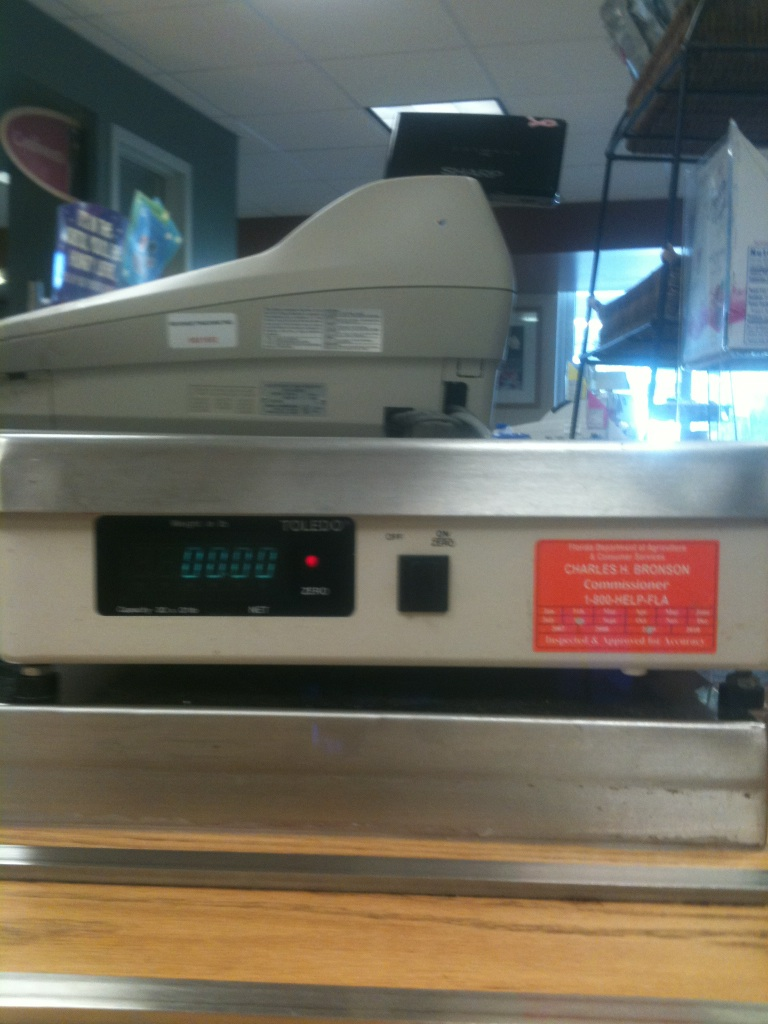
Scales used for trade purposes in the United States, as this scale at the checkout in a cafeteria, are inspected for accuracy by the FDACS's Bureau of Weights and Measures.

Most countries regulate the design and servicing of scales used for commerce. For example, in the European Union weighing instruments are subject to 2014/31/EU and 2014/32/EU directives. A conformity assessment procedure is carried out before placing the instrument on the market, andv the instruments are verified after a given period of time in member states of the European Union. This has tended to cause scale technology to lag behind other technologies because expensive regulatory hurdles are involved in introducing new designs. Nevertheless, there has been a trend to "digital load cells" which are actually strain-gauge cells with dedicated analog converters and networking built into the cell itself. Such designs have reduced the service problems inherent with combining and transmitting a number of 20 millivolt signals in hostile environments.

Government regulation generally requires periodic inspections by licensed technicians, using masses whose calibration is traceable to an approved laboratory. Scales intended for non-trade use, such as those used in bathrooms, doctor's offices, kitchens (portion control), and price estimation (but not official price determination) may be produced, but must by law be labelled "Not Legal for Trade" to ensure that they are not re-purposed in a way that jeopardizes commercial interest. In the United States, the document describing how scales must be designed, installed, and used for commercial purposes is NIST Handbook 44. Legal For Trade (LFT) certification usually approve the readability by testing repeatability of measurements to ensure a maximum margin of error of 10%.

Because gravity varies by over 0.5% over the surface of the earth, the distinction between force due to gravity and mass is relevant for accurate calibration of scales for commercial purposes. Usually, the goal is to measure the mass of the sample rather than its force due to gravity at that particular location.

Traditional mechanical balance-beam scales intrinsically measured mass. But ordinary electronic scales intrinsically measure the gravitational force between the sample and the earth, i.e. the weight of the sample, which varies with location. So such a scale has to be re-calibrated after installation, for that specific location, in order to obtain an accurate indication of mass.

==== Sources of error ====
Some of the sources of error in weighing are:

- Buoyancy – Objects in air develop a buoyancy force that is directly proportional to the volume of air displaced. The difference in density of air due to barometric pressure and temperature creates errors.
- Error in the mass of reference weight
- Air gusts, even small ones, which push the scale up or down
- Friction in the moving components that causes the scale to reach equilibrium at a different configuration than a frictionless equilibrium should occur.
- Settling airborne dust contributing to the weight
- Mis-calibration over time, due to drift in the circuit's accuracy, or temperature change
- Mis-aligned mechanical components due to thermal expansion or contraction of components
- Magnetic fields acting on ferrous components
- Forces from electrostatic fields, for example, from feet shuffled on carpets on a dry day
- Chemical reactivity between air and the substance being weighed (or the balance itself, in the form of corrosion)
- Condensation of atmospheric water on cold items
- Evaporation of water from wet items
- Convection of air from hot or cold items
- Gravitational differences for a scale which measures force, but not for a balance.
- Vibration and seismic disturbances

== Hybrid spring and balance scales ==
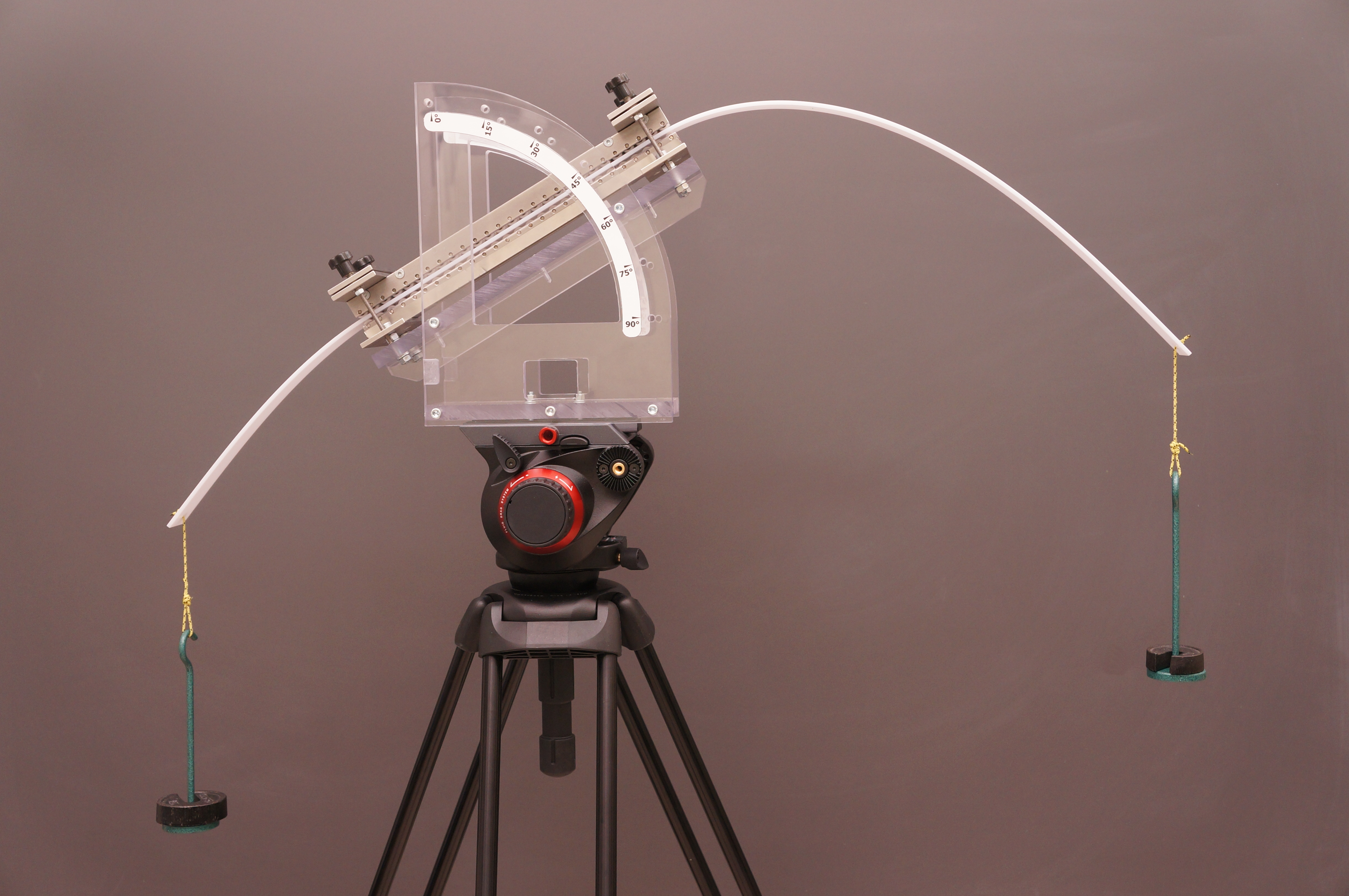
A prototype of an elastic arm scale measuring a mass

=== Elastic arm scale ===
In 2014 a concept of hybrid scale was introduced, the elastically deformable arm scale, which is a combination between a spring scale and a beam balance, exploiting simultaneously both principles of equilibrium and deformation. In this scale, the rigid arms of a classical beam balance (for example a steelyard) are replaced with a flexible elastic rod in an inclined frictionless sliding sleeve. The rod can reach a unique sliding equilibrium when two vertical dead loads (or masses) are applied at its edges. Equilibrium, which would be impossible with rigid arms, is guaranteed because configurational forces develop at the two edges of the sleeve as a consequence of both the free sliding condition and the nonlinear kinematics of the elastic rod. This mass measuring device can also work without a counterweight.

== See also ==
- Ampere balance
- Apparent weight
- Auncel
- Combination weigher
- Digital spoon scale
- Digital Weight Indicator
- Evans balance
- Faraday balance
- Gouy balance
- Kibble balance, also known as a Watt balance
- Mass versus weight
- Multihead weigher
- Nutrition scale
- On-board scale, an on-vehicle truck scale
- Themis
- Weigh house - historic public building for the weighing of goods
- Weigh lock - for weighing canal barges
- Weigh station, a checkpoint to inspect vehicular weights, usually equipped with a truck scale (weigh bridge)
