= Dm3 =

Dm3 may refer to:

- Cubic decimetre ($\mathrm{dm}^3$), a volume unit which is exactly equivalent to a litre
- SJ Dm3 locomotives pulling iron ore trains in Sweden and Norway
- DM3 density meter density measurement system for industrial in-line slurries
- Despicable Me 3, a 2017 film
- dm3, an instant messaging protocol
