= Truck scale =

Scales used to weigh rail or road vehicles and their contents

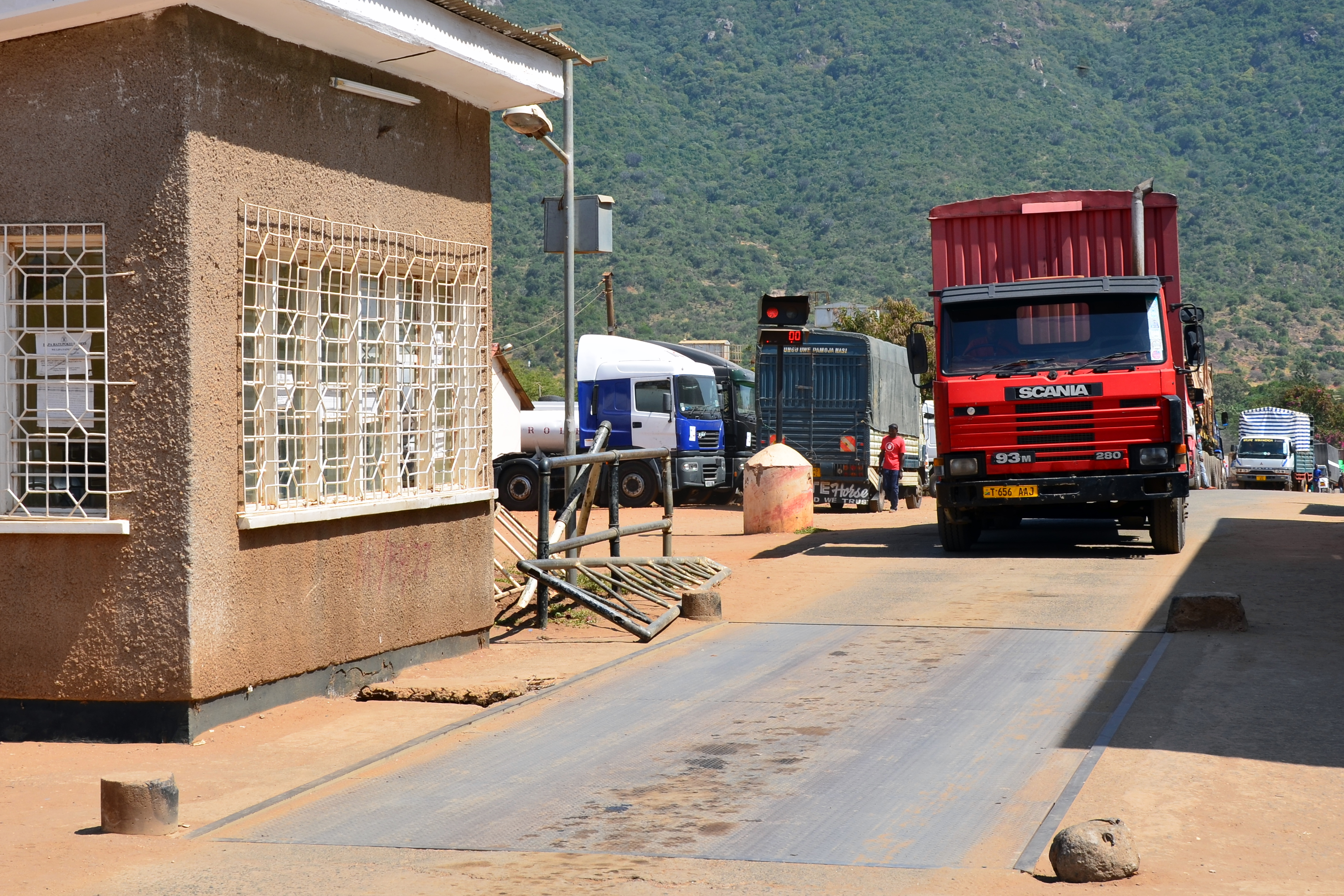
A weighbridge (foreground) in Tanzania

A truck scale (US), weighbridge (non-US) or railroad scale is a large set of scales, usually mounted permanently on a concrete foundation, that is used to weigh entire rail or road vehicles and their contents. By weighing the vehicle both empty and when loaded, the load carried by the vehicle can be calculated.

The key component that uses a weighbridge in order to make the weight measurement is load cell.

== Weight certification in the United States ==
Commercial scales have to be National Type Evaluation Program (NTEP) approved or certified. The certification is issued by the National Conference on Weights and Measures (NCWM), in accordance to the National Institute of Standards and Technology (NIST), "Handbook 44" specifications and tolerances, through Conformity Assessment and the Verified Conformity Assessment Program (VCAP)

=== Legal for trade ===
Handbook 44: General Code paragraph G-A.1.; And the NIST Handbook 130 (Uniform Weights and Measures Law; Section 1.13.) define Commercial Weighing and Measuring Equipment as follows;

weights and measures and weighing and measuring devices commercially used or employed in establishing the size, quantity, extent, area, or measurement of quantities, things, produce, or articles for distribution or consumption, purchased, offered, or submitted for sale, hire, or award, or in computing any basic charge or payment for services rendered on the basis of weight or measure.

NTEP approved scales are generally considered those scales which are intended by the manufacturer for use in commercial applications where products are sold by weight. NTEP Approved is also known as Legal for Trade or complies with Handbook 44. NTEP scales are commonly used for applications ranging from weighing coldcuts at the deli, to fruit at the roadside farm stand, shipping centers for determining shipping cost to weighing gold and silver and more.

== Rail weighbridge ==
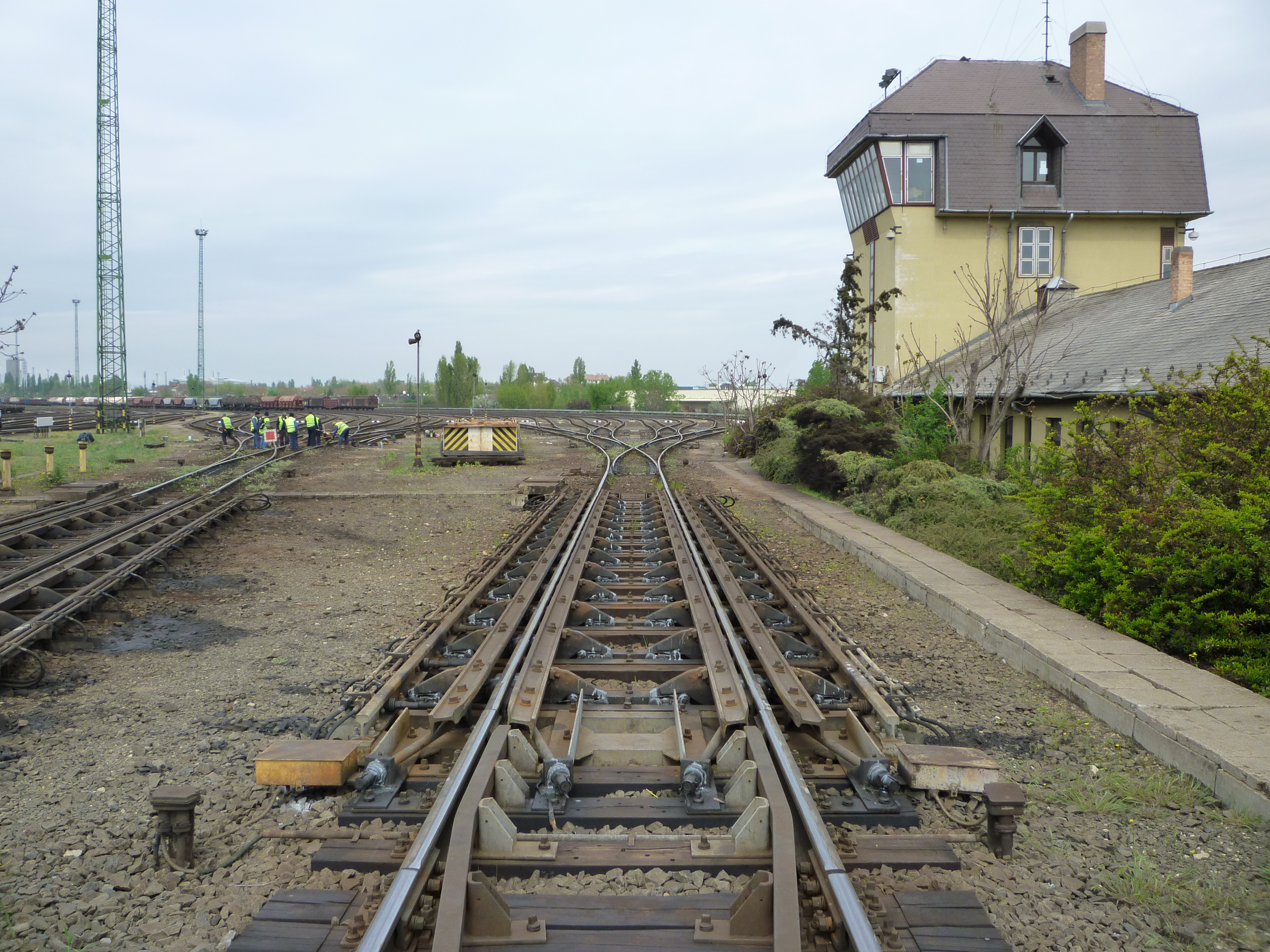
A weigh bridge in a hump classification type of yard

A rail weighbridge is used to weigh rolling stock including railroad cars, goods wagons and locomotives, empty or loaded. When loaded, the net weight of the cargo is the gross weight less the tare weight when known. These are calibrated using scale test cars, which are often old freight cars rebuilt to have a very precise and exact weight. It is also used to weigh trams.

There are different types, but all of them have electronic sensors built into the track that measure the weight. All designs have in common that there must be a sufficient approach and departure distance in front of and behind the respective scale. All of them can measure independently of the direction of travel and whether the train is being pushed or pulled.

In principle, a distinction is made between three different types of construction:

=== 1. Dynamic track weighbridge ===
The dynamic weighbridge consists of one or more weighbridges that can be connected together. The construction of the weighbridge is similar to the static track scales with load cells and weighing platform. The rails are applied to the weighing platform and are designed with rail bevelling. Rail switches are integrated into the rails to detect the position of the wagons on the scale. Together with the weighing terminal and the software, the weight of the individual wagons or the bogies is determined dynamically during the passage at up to 10 km/h.

Advantages:

- Weighing accuracy class up to 0.2 for individual wagon weights in accordance with calibration regulations and OIML-R 106,
- Due to the modular design, liquids can also be dynamically weighed in a verifiable manner,
- Suitable as a static reference scale for calibration, thus saving costs with every recalibration,
- A weighbridge is very robust and durable due to its construction like a static track scale.

Disadvantages:

- No determination of wheel load and axle loads, however, the design can be expanded to include integrated axle load and wheel load measurement with force sensors in the track.

=== 2. Dynamic track scales with strain gauges in the track ===
For dynamic track scales with force sensors, several force sensors are drilled and pressed into the track. When a train passes over the scales at up to 30 km/h, the rail is deformed by the mass of the vehicle (deformation). The change in material stress deforms the sensor, in which strain gauges are mounted as in a classic load cell. Thus, the weight of the individual wheelset or bogie can be calculated from the specific deformation behaviour of the rail.

Advantages:

- Can be used as a wheel load scale and axle load scale,
- Higher measuring speeds possible than with the other two designs,
- Comparatively inexpensive due to the use of only a small amount of hardware and little track construction work.

Disadvantages:

- Not calibratable,
- Accuracy depends on passing speed,
- Can only be used for solids.

=== 3. Dynamic track scales based on weighing sleepers ===
A dynamic track weigher based on weighing sleepers is, like the strain gauge rail weigher, a gapless construction without rail cuts. In simple terms, several sleepers are removed from the track and replaced by weighing sleepers. Load cells are installed in these sleepers. Compared to the weighbridge, the gapless (and thus force-coupled) design means that the weighbridge cannot be statically adjusted, but can only operate purely dynamically. This requires a very stable substructure without a jump in stiffness. The difference to the scale with strain gauge in the rail is that calibratable sensors can be used for this variant and the scale is therefore calibratable.

Advantages:

- Weighing accuracy class up to 0.2 for individual wagon weights in accordance with calibration regulations and OIML-R 106,
- Like the scales with strain gauges in the rail, the hardware volume is low,
- Modular design also enables legal-for-trade dynamic weighing of liquids.

Disadvantages:

- Static reference scale required for dynamic calibration, which increases the costs for recalibration,
- Costly substructure/track construction work required (to ensure long-term stability, a resin-based ballast bonding is usually used for the weighing track. A procedure that creates an almost fixed track).

== Types ==
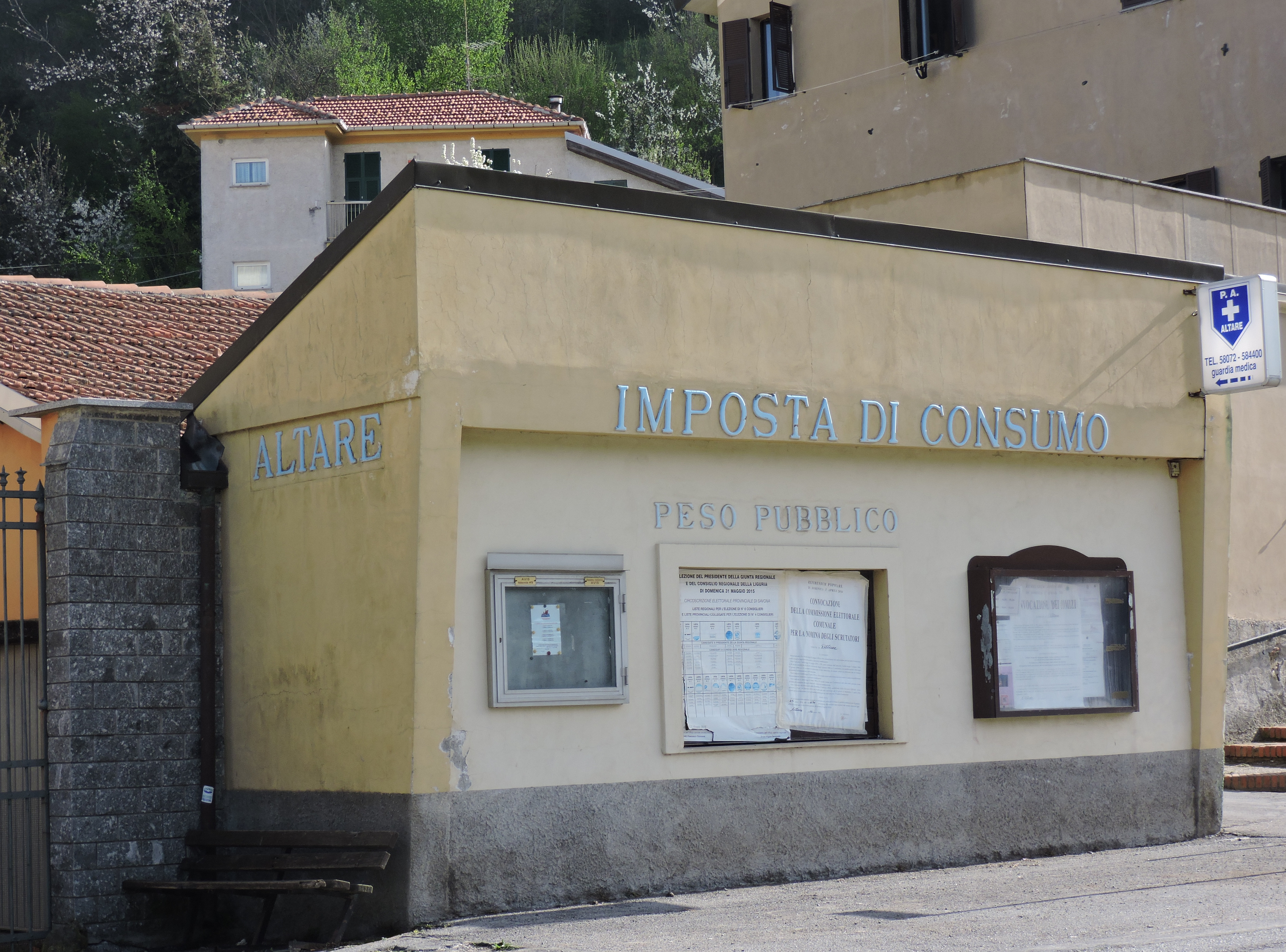
Truck scale in Altare (Italy)

- Electronic (deep pit type)
- Electronic (pit less type)
- Digital (deep pit type)
- Digital (shallow pit)
- Digital (pit less type)
- Rail weighbridge
- Movable Weighbridge
- Mechanical weighbridge
- Mechanical (digital type)
- Electro-mechanical
- Portable weighbridge
- Axle scales
- Portable ramp end scales
- In-motion weighbridge

== Design concept ==
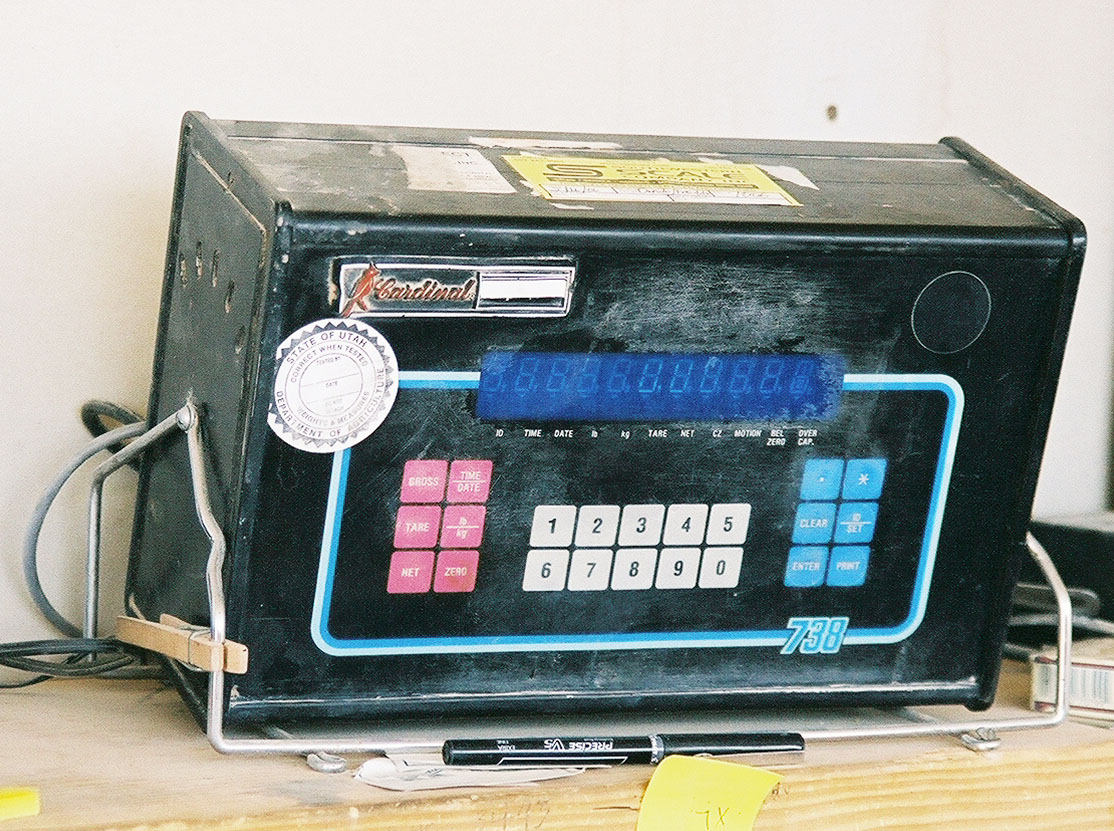
Electronic indicator for the bridge shown above. This allows input of the vehicle empty weight and can compute and display the amount of material.

A full-size weighbridge

Truck scales can be surface mounted with a ramp leading up a short distance and the weighing equipment underneath or they can be pit mounted with the weighing equipment and platform in a pit so that the weighing surface is level with the road. They are typically built from steel or concrete and by nature are extremely robust.

In earlier versions the bridge is installed over a rectangular pit that contains levers that ultimately connect to a balance mechanism. The most complex portion of this type is the arrangement of levers underneath the weighbridge since the response of the scale must be independent of the distribution of the load. Modern devices use multiple load cells that connect to electronic equipment to totalize the sensor inputs. In either type of semi-permanent scale the weight readings are typically recorded in a nearby hut or office.

Many weighbridges are now linked to a PC which runs truck scale software capable of printing tickets and providing reporting features.

== Uses ==
Truck scales can be used for two main purposes:

- Selling or charging by weight over the bridge (Trade Approved)
- Check weighing both axle weights and gross vehicle weights. This helps to stop axle overloading and possible heavy fines.

They are used in industries that manufacture or move bulk items, such as in mines or quarries, garbage dumps / recycling centers, bulk liquid and powder movement, household goods, and electrical equipment. Since the weight of the vehicle carrying the goods is known (and can be ascertained quickly if it is not known by the simple expedient of weighing the empty vehicle) they are a quick and easy way to measure the flow of bulk goods in and out of different locations.

A single axle truck scale or axle weighing system can be used to check individual axle weights and gross vehicle weights to determine whether the vehicle is safe to travel on the public highway without being stopped and fined by the authorities for being overloaded. Similar to the full size truck scale these systems can be pit mounted with the weighing surface flush to the level of the roadway or surface mounted.

For many uses (such as at police over the road truck weigh stations or temporary road intercepts) weighbridges have been largely supplanted by simple and thin electronic weigh cells, over which a vehicle is slowly driven. A computer records the output of the cell and accumulates the total vehicle weight. By weighing the force of each axle it can be assured that the vehicle is within statutory limits, which typically will impose a total vehicle weight, a maximum weight within an axle span limit and an individual axle limit. The former two limits ensure the safety of bridges while the latter protects the road surface.

== Portable versions ==
Portable truck scales can also be found in use around the world. A portable truck scale will have lower frame work that can be placed on non-typical surfaces such as dirt. These scales retain the same level of accuracy as a pit-type scale, with accuracy of up to + or - 1%. The first portable truck scale record in the US was units operated by the Weight Patrol of the Los Angeles Motor Patrol in 1929. Four such weighing units were used with one under each of the trucks wheels. Each unit could record up to 15,000 pounds (6,800 kg).

== See also ==
- On-board scale
- Tare weight
- Weigh lock
- Weigh station
- Weighing scale
