= Decimal balance =

Type of weighing scale

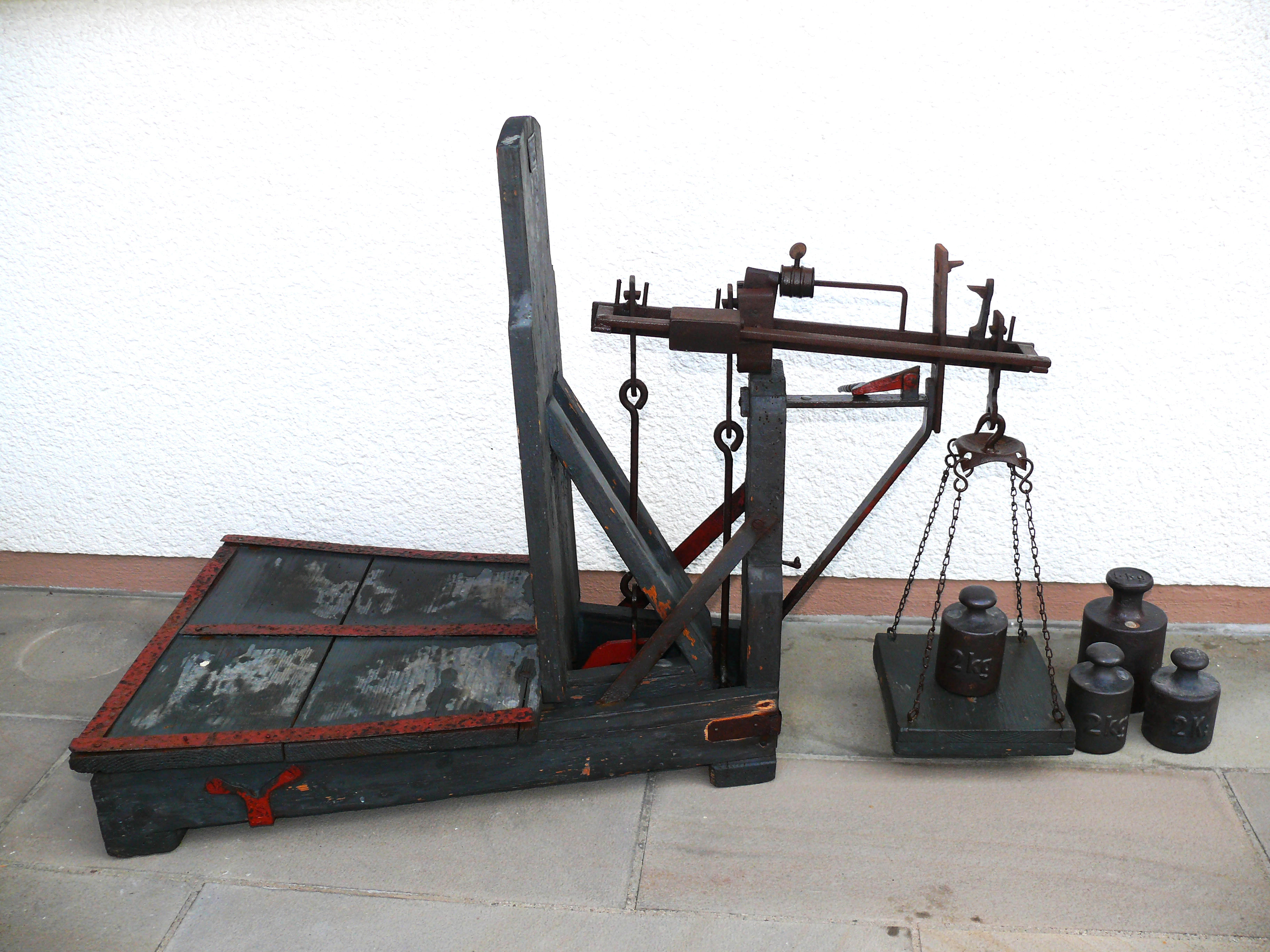
Old decimal balance scale

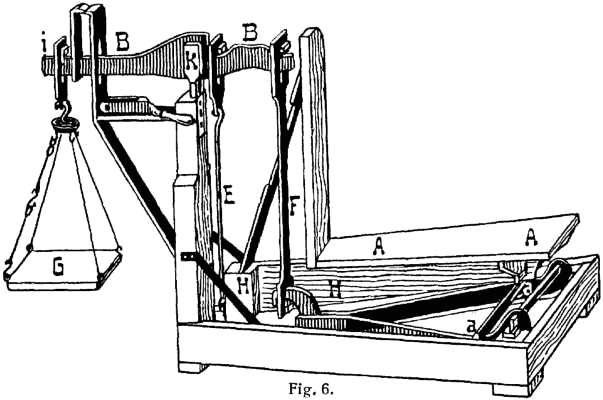
A drawing to illustrate a design with two-point support of the platform

A decimal balance or decimal scale is a balance scale which uses the lever in which the arm for weights is 10 times longer than the arm for weighted objects, so that much lighter weights may be used to weigh heavy object. Similarly a centesimal balance uses arms in ratio 1:100.

Since the platform for the load has large area, it employs two supports connected to the shorter arm, with the second support connected via a lever run horizontally under the platform, to ensure that the weight measurement does not depend on its placement on the platform.
