= DM3 density meter =

The DM3 density meter (also known as the DM3 or SCIAM DM3 density meter) is a newly developed system for density measurement. A part of a continuous, in-line measurement device that is used in major slurry industries and applications to accurately and safely calculate density.

== Principle ==
The DM3 weighs media (slurry) as it travels through a metered section of pipe using a patented, high resolution load cell. Using linear, direct sensing of mass per unit volume, measurement system within a reinforced rubber tube. This in-line section of pipe calculates the percentage of dry solids, wet density or wet and dry mass flow units. When coupled with compatible volumetric flow meters and processing units, this system gives a true value for density and mass flow. The DM3 is a bi-directional unit which allows media to flow continuously through either ends. "C" Clamps located within the DM3 allows the flow tube to withhold high levels of pressure encountered. The flow tube was designed to focus on the highest amount of accuracy, resolution, and least amount of weight without compromising mechanical stability and reliability. Because of the sensitivity of measurement provided by DM3, each unit must be programmed and calibrated to accommodate the variation in Earth's gravitational force.

Until now, the most critical problem with traditional density measurement systems is the effect of externally induced vibration and media noise superimposed on the weights signal. Designed for this purpose, the DM3 absorbs a significant amount of energy from external media noise and vibration due to low natural frequency (known as Pink noise). It is necessary to compensate for these forces which affect the true density signal. Pink noise is interrogated by the DM3 transmitter over 110 times per second to ensure repeatability and calculate the positive and negative values for each period to ensure accurate and repeatable measurement of the slurry within a 45 millisecond response time.

== Components ==
1. Carbon steel pressure chamber: Pressure Limits: 0 – 10,000 psi
2. Flow tube: reinforced walls up to 36 mm (1.5”) thick, lined with natural gum rubber. Highly resistant to wear, including abrasive media.
3. Load cell: highly sensitive, NIST traceable
4. DM3 transmitter

== Comparison ==
Key traits

1. Operates at < ±0.5% full scale accuracy with values repeatable to ±0.1% full scale.
2. Continuously measures a large representative sample in real time
3. Ability for partially buried for use on land.
4. Roll compensated up to 20 °C transversely or longitudinally for dredging vessels.
5. Vibration compensated, which when combined with the anti-vibration algorithm in the transmitter, ensures high accuracy in heavy industrial environments.
6. Follows international flange standards; includes ANSI 150, DIN/BS 4504 PN10, AS 2129 Table D and JIS 10k rf.
7. Measures and compensates for velocity coefficient errors
8. Interchangeable wear parts with minimal maintenance downtime
9. Entrained gas – First device which provides the ability to measure entrained gas; includes those non-conductive.

== Certifications/Standards ==
Certifications

- UL
- IECEE
- NIST
- CE
- NTEP
- WEDA

Standards

- ANSI 150
- AS 2129
- DIN 4504, EN 50 081-2 and 082-2, PN10
- Pressure Equipment Directive
- Japanese Industrial Standards 10k rf
