= On-board scale =

Mobile weighing system for trucks

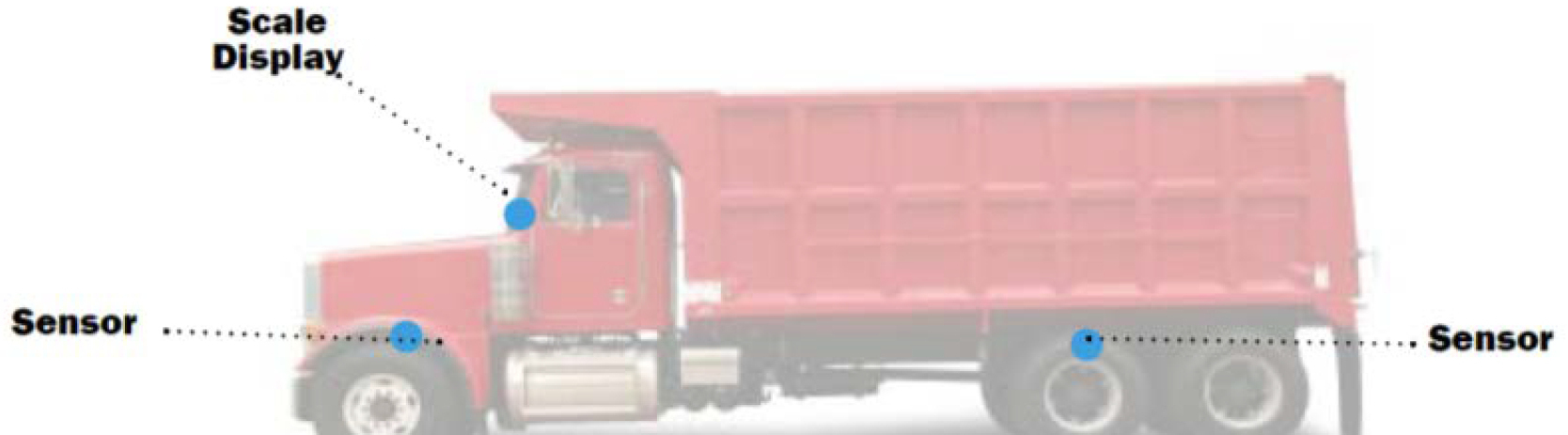
Shows sensors for steer and drive axle weights, and operator weight readout.

On-board scales are mobile weighing systems that have been integrated into a vehicle, such as a flatbed truck or semi-trailer. In the United States, such scales are used primarily as a self-check for weight compliance. Thus the operator can use the scale to determine the weight of the vehicle as it is loaded. This enables the operator to avoid penalties by complying with state weight laws, while still transporting the maximum allowable weight. Weight laws are based on safety considerations; in the United States, the Federal Highway Administration requires each state to certify its enforcement of weight laws. In addition, some states allow on-board scales approved under the National Type Evaluation Program (NTEP) to be considered legal for trade.

== Benefits ==
The convenience of being able to weigh at the loading site is a key factor in the acceptance of on-board scales. Other factors include:

- avoiding overweight penalties with consequent reduction of driver anxiety and thus greater driver retention;
- the ability to load knowledgeably to the maximum permissible weight;
- eliminating costs associated with using an in-ground scale, including lost hours of service, scale fees, extra fuel costs to visit the scale, and driver wages;
- if the scale is equipped with a printer, the ability to provide a weight receipt ("weight ticket") to the customer;
- for scales connected to an on-truck computer network such as SAE J1939, the possibility of more efficient drivetrain performance based on current truck weight;
- for scales connected directly or via other on-vehicle devices to a wide area network, enhanced corporate ability to manage a fleet based on vehicle weights.

For refuse vehicles and fleets, the additional benefits of on-board scales include the following:

- avoiding vehicle damage arising from overloading;
- ability to audit pickup routes and set rates appropriately, by identifying customers who are overloading bins;
- establishing more efficient routes based on customer bin weight data.

On-board scales sometimes appear in non-commercial applications. In one such, the Federal Motor Carrier Safety Administration used an on-board scale in 2009 on a technology demonstration vehicle. The scale was one among several systems intended to provide information for researchers developing tools to determine the safety fitness of a vehicle. Considering an unrelated possible non-commercial application, in 2015 the Federal Highway Administration wrote: "Recording and collecting data from on-board load cells can provide a metric for [weight law] compliance."

== History ==
On-board scales have been used on vocational trucks^{a} at least since 1985. Among the first industries to use these scales were logging operations, in which the difficulty of determining the weight of newly cut logs, with their varying density and moisture content, was problematic. Avoiding overweight tickets by weighing when loading the logs was the incentive for using these scales. As more states began more rigorously enforcing weight limits in the early 1990s, other vocational trucking industries, such as waste hauling and aggregate hauling, began to install on-board scales.

In 1987, "On-Board Load Cell" received a US Patent. This system was based on the application of a strain gauge to a sensor mounted to a vehicle's frame. The measured strain is described as "being representative of the weight of the vehicle load." Two years later, in 1989, "A Vehicle Mounted Load Indicator System" received a US Patent. This system was based on the air pressure in a truck's air suspension. It relied on calibration and claimed an accurate reading of the weight of the carried load, transmitted to a readout. On-board scales using the technology described in this patent were first sold in 1991.

Already by 1995, the Society of Automotive Engineers was publishing a "History of On-Board Electronic Truck Scales and Future Design Trends". This review's abstract notes that newer on-board scale systems included calibration data in the load sensors, which would function as part of an on-truck computer network. Thus, a calibrated load sensor on a trailer or semi-trailer could be attached to any tractor that could receive the trailer sensor's weight transmission over the network. Acceptance of on-board scales increased to the point that in 2008, for instance, all thirteen comments from poultry growers and agricultural associations, concerning a proposed U. S. Department of Agriculture rule, requested that the Department "not permit the delivery of ... feed for more than one grower on a single truck unless the truck has an on-board scale and weighing system, specifically when feed is taken from one farm directly to another." [emphasis added.]

== Types of on-board weighing systems ==
=== Load-cell scales ===
Load-cell scales are based on electronic load cell transducers, and can be mechanical or strain-gauge. There is a wide variety of scale types that can be built with load cell technology. For example, in vehicles with spring suspension, payload scales commonly use load cells. As with other electronic scales, the weight may be transmitted to an operator readout. It may be further transmitted via a wide area network to a company office or corporate headquarters.

=== Electronic scales with PSI sensors ===
Electronic scales with PSI sensors measure air pressure in a vehicle's air suspension. The scale relays this data to a receiver hardwired into the cab, or wirelessly to a handheld unit such as a smart phone, either of which will interpret the data and display axle weight(s) and/or gross vehicle weight. Data may be further transmitted via a wide area network to a company office or corporate headquarters.

=== Waste bin loader scales ===
These are scales that determine the weight of the contents of a waste bin as it is being loaded onto a waste hauler truck. Their sensors, customized by each scale manufacturer, are generally based on strain gauges. They may use temperature sensors to allow for correct results with varying temperatures. As with other electronic scales, the bin weight may be transmitted to an operator readout, or via a wide area network to a company office or corporate headquarters.

=== Air-suspension load scales ===
These non-electric gauges are analog (dial-face), and include versions that can be calibrated for accuracy. Suitable for air-ride applications, they show on-the-ground weight in pounds (LBS) or kilograms (KG) instead of standard PSI.

=== Air-suspension PSI gauges ===
Air-suspension PSI gauges are used on commercial trucks and semi-trailers where accurate weights are not as critical. These are not scales as such, but may be usable for estimating weight.

== Commercial distribution ==
On-board scale manufacturers are located on most continents. Channels of distribution for these scales include Original equipment manufacturer (OEM) sales through truck or trailer companies as either a standard part of the vehicle or an option. Truck dealerships or service centers may provide the scales as an aftermarket option, including to truck fleets as well as individual truck owners.

== See also ==
- Truck scale

== Notes ==
^a Vocational trucks are designed for a specific task, such as collecting refuse, mixing and pouring concrete, firefighting and the like. Each is custom-built on a truck chassis and may be light-, medium-, or heavy-duty.
