= Printer cable =

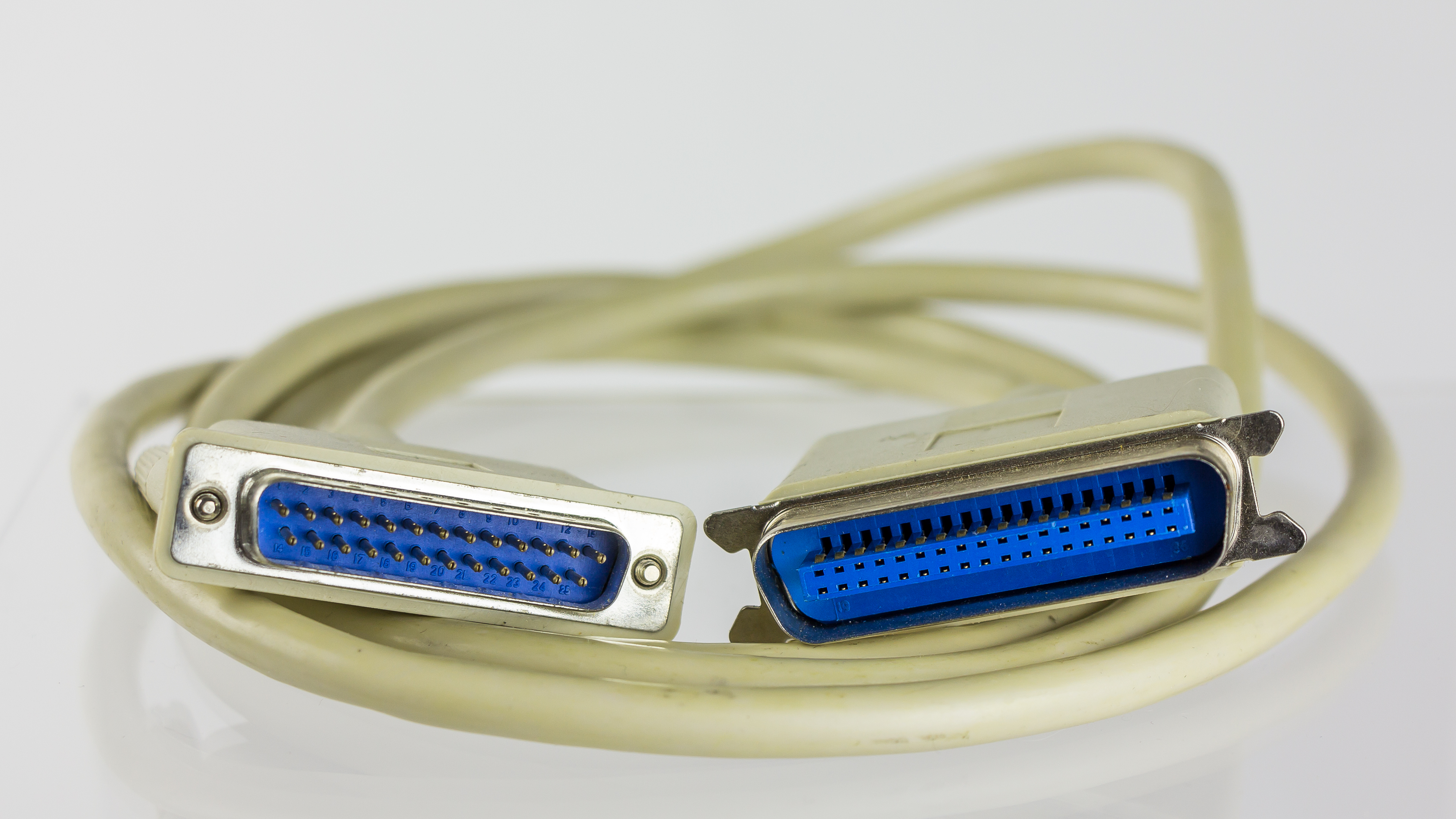

Printer cable refers to the cable that carries data between a computer and a printer.

There are many different types of cables, for example:

- Serial: RS-232, EIA-422
- Parallel
- FireWire
- USB

Parallel port printers have been slowly phased out, and are now difficult to find for the most part, being considered as an obsolete legacy port on most new computers. Those who have printers and scanners with only parallel port may still be able to connect the devices via the use of USB adapters a.k.a. USB-to-parallel cable, or use a PCI parallel printer port card.
