= National Conference on Weights and Measures =

Technical standards organisation

National Council on Weights and Measures
- Location within Nebraska
- Formation: 1905; 121 years ago
- Purpose: Weights and measures
- Headquarters: Lincoln, Nebraska
- Coordinates: 40.8111295°N 96.7072691°W
- Region served: United States
- Executive Director: Don Onwiler
- National Type Evaluation Program Administrator: Jeff Gibson
- Website: www.ncwm.com

The National Council on Weights and Measures (NCWM) is a not-for-profit standards development organization, dedicated to developing the United States technical standards for weights and measures in commerce. The organization's official mission is "Ensuring Equity and Uniform Standards in a Changing Marketplace."

== History ==
The Weights and Measures Law was first signed into law on March 2, 1799 by President John Adams. In 1905, a meeting of the states was held to address the challenges of regulating weights and measures. As a result, an agreement was made to convene annually to set national standards for voluntary adoption and implementation by the states. The National Conference on Weights and Measures (NCWM) emerged from this effort to bring stakeholders together. With the exception of 11 years, annual meetings have been held every year since.

From 1905 to 1957, the Director of the National Bureau of Standards served as the Chairman of NCWM. Starting in 1958, NCWM members began electing a state or local weights and measures official each year to serve as chairman. The National Bureau of Standards, later renamed the National Institute of Standards and Technology, continued to manage meetings and membership until 1997, when NCWM formed a 501(c)(6) not-for-profit standards development organization. From 1998 to 2008, NCWM contracted management services through a private company. In 2008, the Board of Directors hired the first NCWM employees, Don Onwiler as Executive Director and James Truex as National Type Evaluation Program (NTEP) Administrator. They hired additional staff and opened offices in Lincoln, Nebraska in August 2008. In 2024 NCWM changed their name to the National Council on Weights and Measures, clarifying to the general public that NCWM is not just a meeting.

NCWM's various model standards are published annually by the National Institute of Standards and Technology (NIST) in three handbooks: Handbook 44: Specifications and Tolerances and Other Technical Requirements for Weighing and Measuring Devices, Handbook 130: Uniform Laws and Regulations, and Handbook 133: Checking the Net Contents of Packaged Goods.

== Organization ==
NCWM is headquartered in Lincoln, Nebraska. NCWM is governed by bylaws as adopted by its membership and policies as set by its board of directors. NCWM administers the National Type Evaluation Program (NTEP). This program provides certification that a manufacturer of a particular model or family of weighing or measuring devices is capable of meeting the United States standards as adopted by NCWM and published in Handbook 44. Most states require NTEP Certification for new equipment placed into commercial service.

== Membership ==
NCWM membership is open to any person. The membership year is October 1 to September 30.

== Committees ==
There are three standing committees.

- Specifications and Tolerances Committee
- Laws and Regulations Committee
- Professional Development Committee

=== Subcommittees ===
- Fuels and Lubricants Subcommittee (FALS)
- Packaging and Labeling Subcommittee (PALS)
- Safety Subcommittee

== National Type Evaluation Program (NTEP) ==
The National Type Evaluation Program (NTEP) is a means of ensuring manufacturers of commercial weighing and measuring instruments are capable of meeting national standards before the instruments are introduced into the marketplace. NTEP provides manufacturers with one evaluation and certification that is accepted throughout the United States.

The NTEP Committee is responsible for oversight of NTEP. The Committee provides final review and approval of recommendations to amend NCWM Publication 14 Technical Policy, Checklists and Test Procedures and makes recommendations to the National Conference on Weights and Measures (NCWM) Board of Directors for amendments to NCWM Publication 14 Administrative Policy. The NTEP Committee also addresses NCWM’s involvement in international standards development and agreements related to type evaluation and certification.

=== NTEP Certificate of Conformance ===
NTEP certification is issued by NCWM upon successful completion of the evaluation process. This NTEP Certificate of Conformance indicates that the device manufacturer has demonstrated the ability to meet applicable requirements for commercial weighing and measuring equipment in the United States as specified in Handbook 44: Specifications and Tolerances and Other Technical Requirements. NTEP certification is required in most states in the United States.

=== NTEP Authorized Laboratories ===
There are nine NTEP-authorized laboratories:

- California Department of Agriculture, Division of Measurement Standards
- Grain Inspection Packers and Stockyard Administration (GIPSA)
- Kansas Department of Agriculture, Weights and Measures Program
- Maryland Department of Agriculture, Weights and Measures Program
- National Institute of Standards and Technology, Mass and Force Group
- New York Department of Agriculture and Markets, Bureau of Weights and Measures
- North Carolina Department of Agriculture, Standards Division
- Ohio Department of Agriculture, Weights and Measures Division
- Oregon Department of Agriculture, Weights and Measures Program
- Measurement Canada

=== National Type Evaluation Program Sectors ===
NTEP serves as a means of assurance that a device will be manufactured in accordance with United States standards for commercial weighing and measuring devices. These standards are adopted by the NCWM and published in Handbook 44: Specifications and Tolerances and Other Technical Requirements. NCWM utilizes special committees called National Type Evaluation Program Sectors to develop the technical policies, checklists and test procedures that are used for the evaluation and certification process. These criteria are published annually in NCWM Publication 14.

Sector members include authorized laboratories, manufacturers, technical advisors and the NTEP Administrator. The sectors provide a forum for consensus building among evaluators and the technical experts who design and market the equipment. There are five NTEP Sectors, each specializing in a particular area of commercial weighing and measurement.

- Grain Analyzer Sector
- Measuring Sector
- Software Sector
- Weighing / Belt-Conveyor Scale Sector

== Meetings ==
NCWM offers many meetings throughout the year to allow every person a voice in the issues facing the weights and measures community today. The meetings have direct impact on the national standards. The two largest conferences are the Interim Meeting and the Annual Meeting. The Interim Meeting is held each January as a forum to develop proposals to amend the United States weights and measures standards contained in Handbooks 44, 130, and 133 and determine each proposal's status for the Annual Meeting. The Annual Meeting is held each July to further develop proposals and vote on proposed amendments to the national standards.

=== Upcoming Meetings ===
- 2023 Interim Meeting / January 8–11, 2023 / Savanah, Georgia
- 108th Annual Meeting / July 30 – August 3, 2023 / Norfolk, Virginia

NCWM also holds numerous NTEP Sector and Work Group meetings throughout the year. Each sector specializes in a particular area of commercial weighing and measurement.

== National Outreach ==
NCWM works in partnership with four regional associations to facilitate a grassroots approach to standards development. They are the Central, Northeastern, Southern and Western Weights and Measures Associations. These associations are stand-alone organizations composed of volunteer leadership from the public and private sectors of the weights and measures community. The leadership and committee structure of these associations is traditionally very similar to that of NCWM.

Regional associations serve as the gateway for new proposals to amend the national standards. Any person or organization may submit a proposal to one or all of the regions by completing NCWM Form 15. The regional committees will conduct open hearings, deliberate and determine whether these new items will be forwarded to the national committees for further consideration. Regional associations also serve as a means to continue development of items on the agendas of the national committees. Finally, these associations provide an opportunity for state and local officials and private companies to conduct training events, build relationships and assist NCWM in the standards development process.

== Publications ==
The public can have a direct role in developing the laws and regulations for weights and measures by participating in the standards development process. The standards are subject to amendment on an annual basis. They are adopted by NCWM and contained in the following Handbooks and NCWM Publications.

- Handbook 44 Specifications, Tolerances and Other Technical Requirements for Weighing and Measuring Devices
- Handbook 130 Uniform Laws and Regulations in the Areas of Legal Metrology and Engine Fuel Quality
- Handbook 133 Checking the Net Contents of Packaged Goods
- NCWM Publication 14 Administrative Policy
- NCWM Publication 14 Grain Moisture Meters & Near Infrared Grain Analyzers
- NCWM Publication 14 Measuring Devices
- NCWM Publication 14 Weighing Devices
- NCWM Publication 14 CD

== See also ==
- Measurement Canada
