= Characterization of nanoparticles =

Measurement of physical and chemical properties of nanoparticles

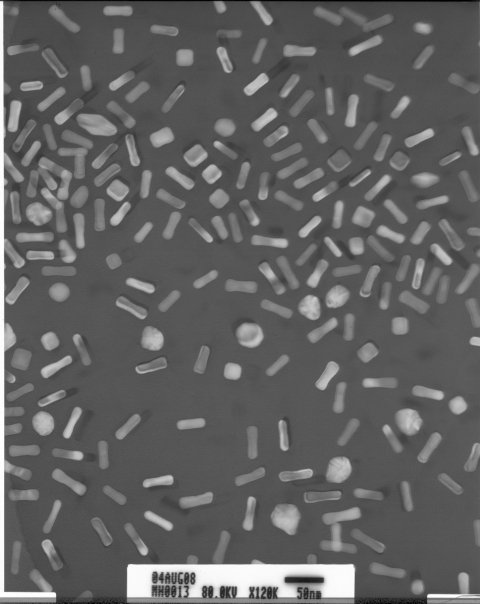
Nanoparticles differ in their physical properties such as size, shape, and dispersion, which must be measured to fully describe them.

The characterization of nanoparticles is a branch of nanometrology that deals with the characterization, or measurement, of the physical and chemical properties of nanoparticles. Nanoparticles measure less than 100 nanometers in at least one of their external dimensions, and are often engineered for their unique properties. Nanoparticles are unlike conventional chemicals in that their chemical composition and concentration are not sufficient metrics for a complete description, because they vary in other physical properties such as size, shape, surface properties, crystallinity, and dispersion state.

Nanoparticles are characterized for various purposes, including nanotoxicology studies and exposure assessment in workplaces to assess their health and safety hazards, as well as manufacturing process control. There is a wide range of instrumentation to measure these properties, including microscopy and spectroscopy methods as well as particle counters. Metrology standards and reference materials for nanotechnology, while still a new discipline, are available from many organizations.

== Background ==
Nanotechnology is the manipulation of matter at the atomic scale to create materials, devices, or systems with new properties or functions. It has potential applications in energy, healthcare, industry, communications, agriculture, consumer products, and other sectors. Nanoparticles measure less than 100 nanometers in at least one of their external dimensions, and often have properties different from the bulk versions of their component materials, which make them technologically useful. This article uses a broad definition of nanoparticles which includes all free nanomaterials regardless of their shape or how many of their dimensions are nanoscale, rather than the more restrictive ISO/TS 80004 definition that only refers to round nano-objects.

Nanoparticles have different analytical requirements than conventional chemicals, for which chemical composition and concentration are sufficient metrics. Nanoparticles have other physical properties that must be measured for a complete description, such as size, shape, surface properties, crystallinity, and dispersion state. The bulk properties of nanoparticles are sensitive to small variations in these properties, which has implications for process control in their industrial use. These properties also influence the health effects of exposure to nanoparticles of a given composition.

An additional challenge is that sampling and laboratory procedures can perturb the nanoparticles' dispersion state, or bias the distribution of their other properties. In environmental contexts, many methods cannot detect low concentrations of nanoparticles that may still have an adverse effect. A high background of natural and incidental nanoparticles may interfere with detection of the target engineered nanoparticle, as it is difficult to distinguish the two. Nanoparticles may also be mixed with larger particles. For some applications, nanoparticles may be characterized in complex matrices such as water, soil, food, polymers, inks, complex mixtures of organic liquids such as in cosmetics, or blood.

== Types of methods ==
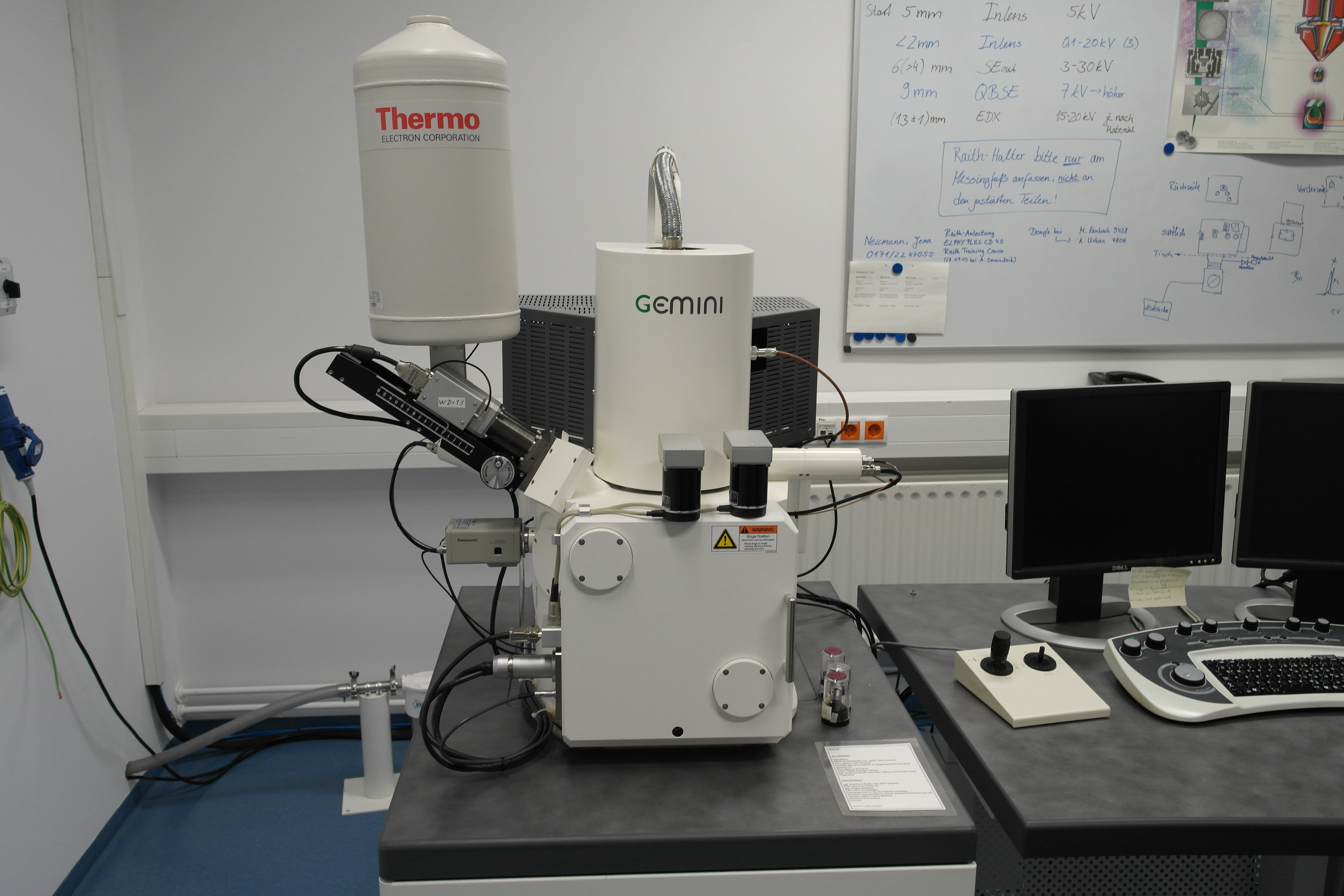
Microscopes such as this scanning electron microscope can image individual nanoparticles to characterize their shape, size, and location.

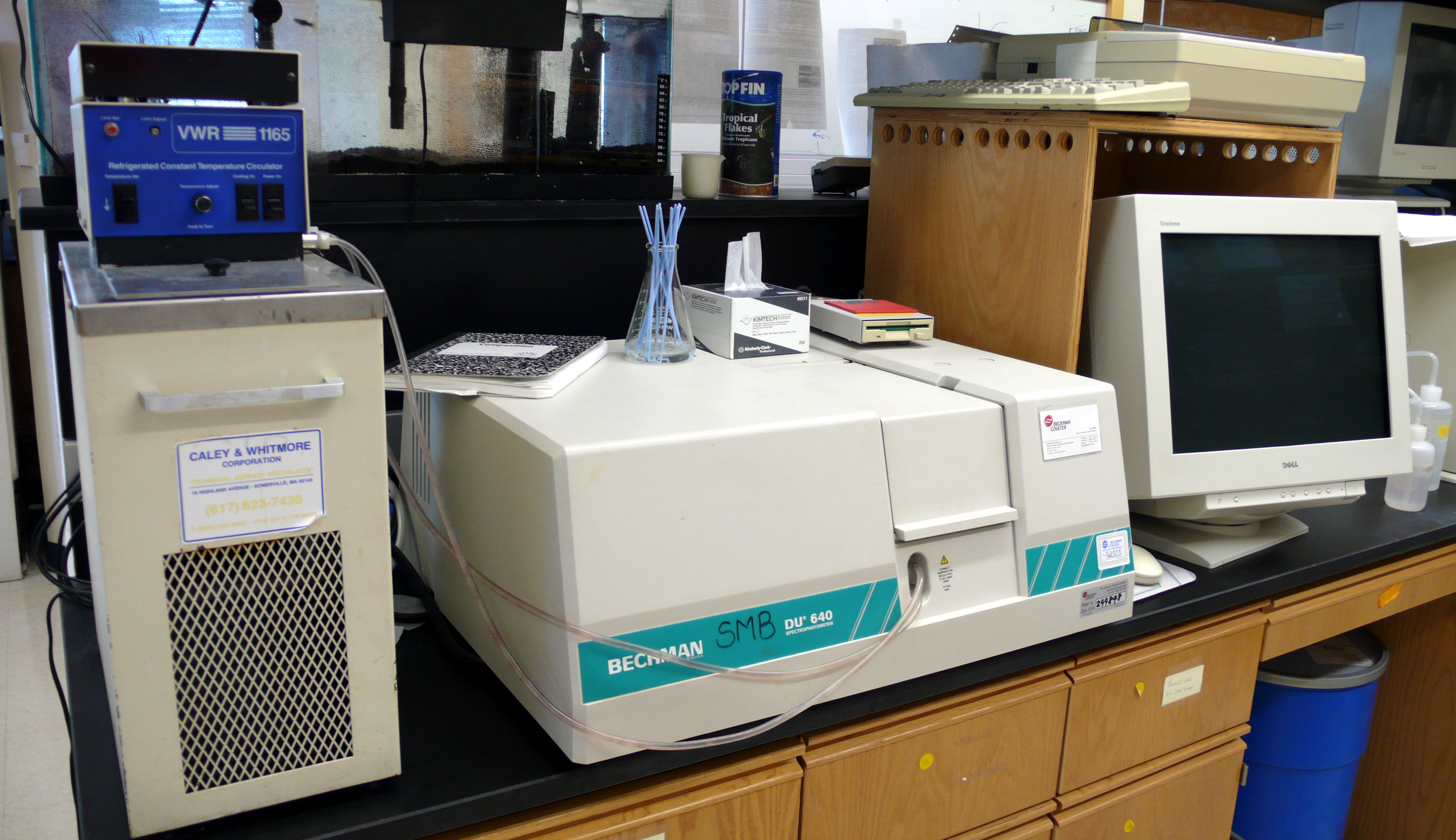
An ultraviolet–visible spectrophotometer can provide information about concentration, size, and shape.

Microscopy methods generate images of individual nanoparticles to characterize their shape, size, and location. Electron microscopy and scanning probe microscopy are the dominant methods. Because nanoparticles have a size below the diffraction limit of visible light, conventional optical microscopy is not useful. Electron microscopes can be coupled to spectroscopic methods that can perform elemental analysis. Microscopy methods are destructive, and can be prone to undesirable artifacts from sample preparation such as drying or vacuum conditions required for some methods, or from probe tip geometry in the case of scanning probe microscopy. Additionally, microscopy is based on single-particle measurements, meaning that large numbers of individual particles must be characterized to estimate their bulk properties. A newer method, enhanced dark-field microscopy with hyperspectral imaging, shows promise for imaging nanoparticles in complex matrices such as biological tissue with higher contrast and throughput.

Spectroscopy, which measures the particles' interaction with electromagnetic radiation as a function of wavelength, is useful for some classes of nanoparticles to characterize concentration, size, and shape. Semiconductor quantum dots are fluorescent and metal nanoparticles exhibit surface plasmon absorbances, making both amenable to ultraviolet–visible spectroscopy. Infrared, nuclear magnetic resonance, and X-ray spectroscopy are also used with nanoparticles. Light scattering methods using laser light, X-rays, or neutron scattering are used to determine particle size, with each method suitable for different size ranges and particle compositions.

Some miscellaneous methods are electrophoresis for surface charge, the Brunauer–Emmett–Teller method for surface area, and X-ray diffraction for crystal structure; as well as mass spectrometry for particle mass, and particle counters for particle number. Chromatography, centrifugation, and filtration techniques can be used to separate nanoparticles by size or other physical properties before or during characterization.

== Metrics ==
=== Size and dispersion ===
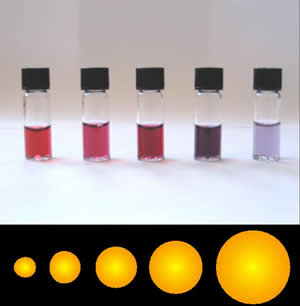
Nanoparticles with different particle sizes can have different physical properties. For example, gold nanoparticles of different sizes appear as different colors.

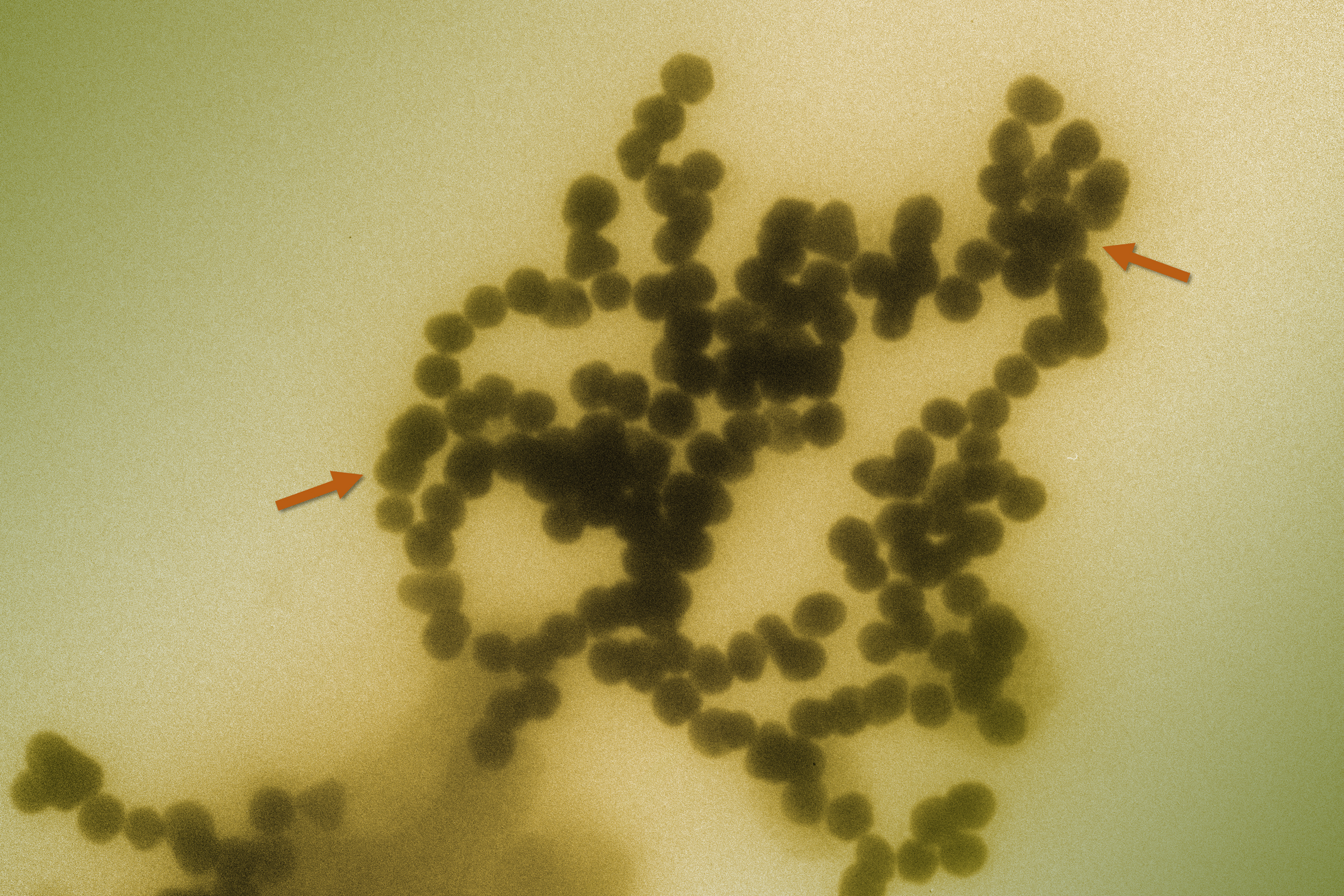
Dispersion is the degree to which particles clump together into weakly bound agglomerates (pictured) or strongly bound aggregates.

Particle size is the external dimensions of a particle, and dispersity is a measure of the range of particle sizes in a sample. If the particle is elongated or irregularly shaped, the size will differ between dimensions, although many measurement techniques yield an equivalent spherical diameter based on the surrogate property being measured. Size can be calculated from physical properties such as settling velocity, diffusion rate or coefficient, and electrical mobility. Size can also be calculated from microscope images using measured parameters such as Feret diameter, Martin diameter and projected area diameters; electron microscopy is often used for this purpose for nanoparticles. Size measurements may differ between methods because they measure different aspects of particle dimensions, they average distributions over an ensemble differently, or the preparation for or operation of the method may change the effective particle size.

For airborne nanoparticles, techniques for measuring size include cascade impactors, electrical low-pressure impactors, mobility analyzers, and time-of-flight mass spectrometers. For nanoparticles in suspension, techniques include dynamic light scattering, laser diffraction, field flow fractionation, nanoparticle tracking analysis, particle tracking velocimetry, size exclusion chromatography, centrifugal sedimentation, and atomic force microscopy. For dry materials, techniques for measuring size include electron microscopy, atomic force microscopy, and X-ray diffraction. Back-calculation from surface area measurements are commonly employed, but these are subject to error for porous materials. Additional methods include hydrodynamic chromatography, static light scattering, multiangle light scattering, nephelometry, laser-induced breakdown detection, and ultraviolet–visible spectroscopy; as well as near-field scanning optical microscopy, confocal laser scanning microscopy, capillary electrophoresis, ultracentrifugation, cross-flow filtration, small-angle X-ray scattering, and differential mobility analysis. Use of an environmental scanning electron microscope avoids morphological changes caused by the vacuum required for standard scanning electron microscopy, at the cost of resolution.

A closely related property is dispersion, a measure of the degree to which particles clump together into agglomerates or aggregates. While the two terms are often used interchangeably, according to ISO nanotechnology definitions, an agglomerate is a reversible collection of particles weakly bound, for example by van der Waals forces or physical entanglement, whereas an aggregate is composed of irreversibly bonded or fused particles, for example through covalent bonds. Dispersion is often assessed using the same techniques employed to determine size distribution, and the width of a particle size distribution is often used as a surrogate for dispersion. Dispersion is a dynamic process strongly affected by properties of the particles themselves as well as their environment such as pH and ionic strength. Some methods have difficulty distinguishing between a single large particle and a set of smaller agglomerated or aggregated particles; in this case using multiple sizing methods can help resolve the ambiguity, with microscopy being particularly useful.

=== Shape ===
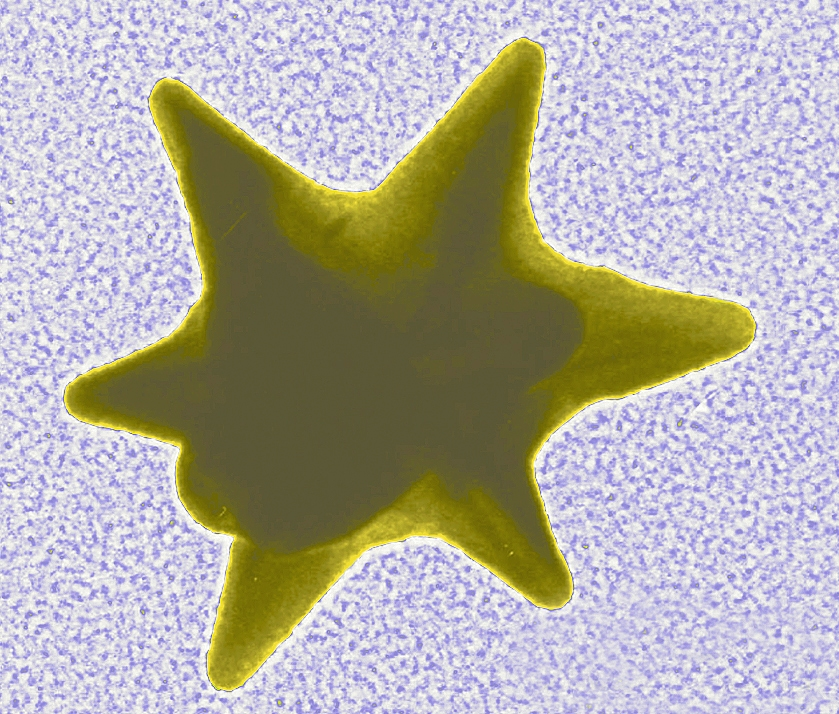
Nanoparticles can take on a non-spherical shape, such as this star-shaped gold nanoparticle

Morphology refers to the physical shape of a particle, as well as its surface topography, for example, the presence of cracks, ridges, or pores. Morphology influences dispersion, functionality, and toxicity, and has similar considerations as size measurements. Evaluation of morphology requires direct visualization of the particles through techniques like scanning electron microscopy, transmission electron microscopy, and atomic force microscopy. Several metrics can be used, such as sphericity or circularity, aspect ratio, elongation, convexity, and fractal dimension. Because microscopy involves measurements of single particles, a large sample size is necessary to ensure a representative sample, and orientation and sample preparation effects must be accounted for.

=== Chemical composition and crystal structure ===
The atoms in a nanoparticle may be arranged in a crystal structure, may be amorphous, or may be intermediate between the two.

Bulk chemical composition refers to the atomic elements of which a nanoparticle is composed, and can be measured in ensemble or single-particle elemental analysis methods. Ensemble techniques include atomic absorption spectroscopy, inductively coupled plasma optical emission spectroscopy or inductively coupled plasma mass spectrometry, nuclear magnetic resonance spectroscopy, neutron activation analysis, X-ray diffraction, X-ray absorption spectroscopy, X-ray fluorescence, and thermogravimetric analysis. Single-particle techniques include time-of-flight mass spectrometry, as well as utilizing elemental detectors such as energy-dispersive X-ray analysis or electron energy loss spectroscopy while using scanning electron microscopy or transmission electron microscopy.

The arrangement of elemental atoms in a nanoparticles may be organized into a crystal structure or may be amorphous. Crystallinity is the ratio of crystalline to amorphous structure. Crystallite size, the size of the crystal unit cell, can be calculated through the Scherrer equation. Generally, crystal structure is determined using powder X-ray diffraction, or selected area electron diffraction using a transmission electron microscope, though others such as Raman spectroscopy exist. X-ray diffraction requires on the order of a gram of material, whereas electron diffraction can be done on single particles.

=== Surface area ===
Surface area is an important metric for engineered nanoparticles because it influences reactivity and surface interactions with ligands. Specific surface area refers to the surface area of a powder normalized to mass or volume. Different methods measure different aspects of surface area.

Direct measurement of nanoparticle surface area utilizes adsorption of an inert gas such as nitrogen or krypton under varying conditions of pressure to form a monolayer of gas coverage. The number of gas molecules needed to form a monolayer and the cross-sectional area of the adsorbate gas molecule are related to the "total surface area" of the particle, including internal pores and crevices, using the Brunauer–Emmett–Teller equation. Organic molecules can be used in place of gasses, such as ethylene glycol monoethyl ether.

There are several indirect measurement techniques for airborne nanoparticles, which do not account for porosity and other surface irregularities and therefore may be inaccurate. Real-time diffusion chargers measure the "active surface area", the area of the particle that interacts with the surrounding gas or ions and is accessible only from the outside. Electrical mobility analyzers calculate the spherical equivalent diameter, which can be converted using geometric relationships. These methods cannot discriminate a nanoparticle of interest from incidental nanoparticles that may occur in complex environments such as workplace atmospheres. Nanoparticles can be collected onto a substrate and their external dimensions can be measured using electron microscopy, then converted to surface area using geometric relations.

=== Surface chemistry and charge ===
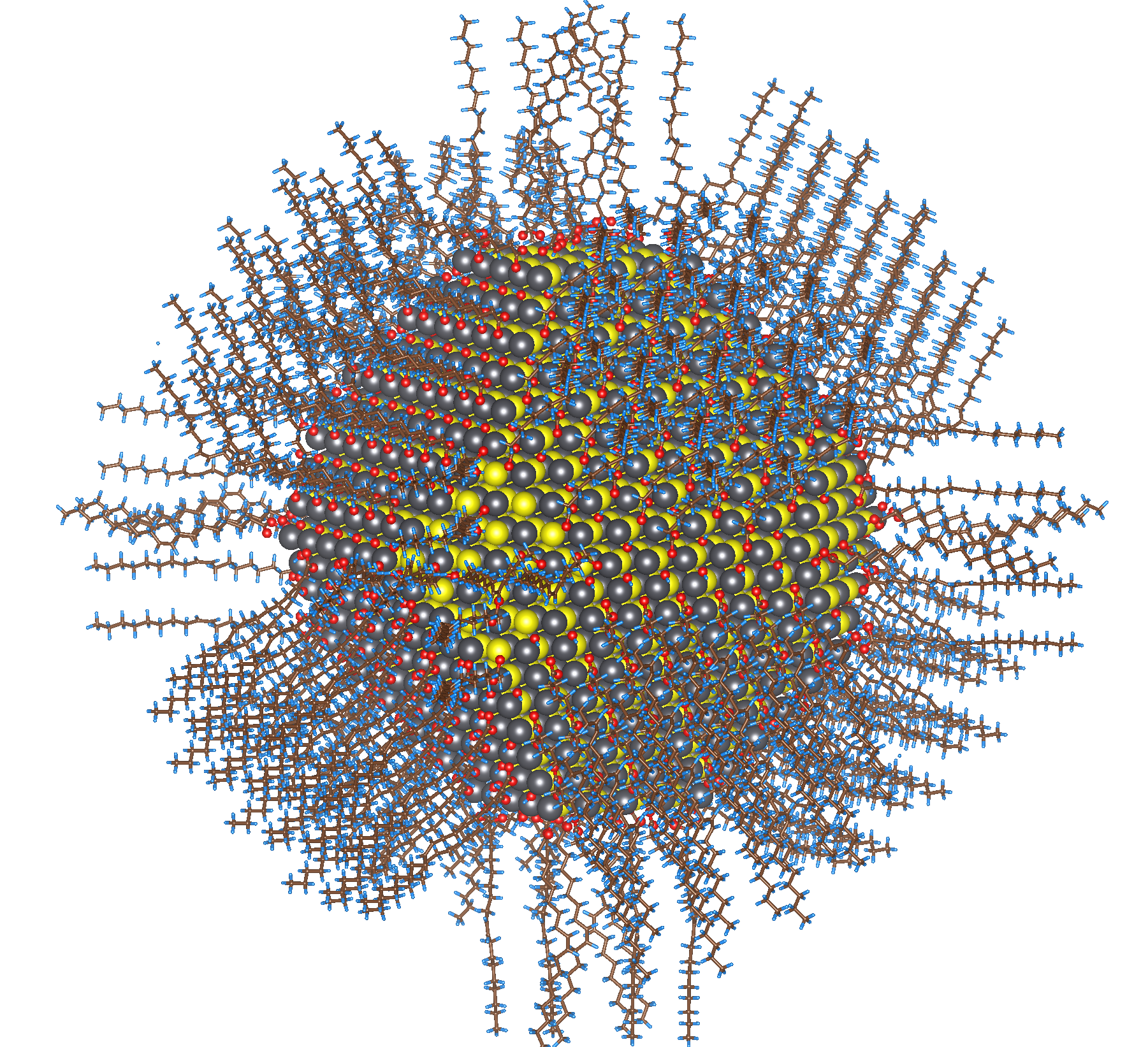
The surface of a nanoparticle may have different composition than the rest of the particle, for example having organic ligands attached to it.

Surface chemistry refers to the elemental or molecular chemistry of particle surfaces. No formal definition exists for what constitutes a surface layer, which is usually defined by the measurement technique employed. For nanoparticles a higher proportion of atoms are on their surfaces relative to micron-scale particles, and surface atoms are in direct contact with solvents and influence their interactions with other molecules. Some nanoparticles such as quantum dots may have a core–shell structure where the outer surface atoms are different than those of the interior core.

Multiple techniques are available to characterize nanoparticle surface chemistry. X-ray photoelectron spectroscopy and Auger electron spectroscopy are well-suited to characterizing a thicker surface layer of 1–5 nm. Secondary ion mass spectroscopy is more useful to characterize just the top few angstroms (10 angstroms = 1 nm), and can be used with sputtering techniques to analyze chemistry as a function of depth. Surface chemistry measurements are particularly sensitive to contamination on particle surfaces, making quantitative analyses difficult, and spatial resolution can be poor. For adsorbed proteins, radiolabelling or mass spectrometry methods such as matrix-assisted laser desorption/ionization (MALDI) can be used.

Surface charge generally refers to the charge from adsorption or desorption of protons on hydroxylated sites on a nanoparticle surface. Surface charge is difficult to directly measure, so the related zeta potential is often measured instead, which is the potential at the double layer's slipping plane, which separates mobile solvent molecules from those that remain attached to the surface. Zeta potential is a calculated rather than measured property, and is a function of both the nanoparticle of interest and its surrounding medium, requiring a description of the measurement temperature; the composition, pH, viscosity, and dielectric constant of the medium; and value used for the Henry function to be meaningful. Zeta potential is used as an indicator of colloidal stability, and has been shown to be predictive of nanoparticle uptake by cells. Zeta potential can be measured by titration to find the isoelectric point, or through electrophoresis including laser Doppler electrophoresis.

Surface energy or wettability are also important for nanoparticle aggregation, dissolution, and bioaccumulation. They can be measured through heat of immersion microcalorimetry studies, or through contact angle measurements. Surface reactivity can also be directly monitored through microcalorimetry using probe molecules that undergo measurable changes.

=== Solubility ===
Solubility is a measurement of the degree to which material dissolves from a nanoparticle to enter solution. Material dissolved as part of a solubiity test can be quantified using atomic absorption spectroscopy, inductively coupled plasma optical emission spectroscopy, and inductively coupled plasma mass spectroscopy, with the last being generally the most sensitive. Two related concepts are biodurability, the rate of dissolution in a biological fluid or surrogate, and biopersistence, the rate at which a material is cleared from an organ such as the lung by physical and chemical dissolution processes.

Analytical techniques for solubility quantitatively measure total elemental concentration in a sample, and do not discriminate between dissolved or solid forms. Therefore, a separation process must be used to remove the remaining particles. Physical separation techniques include size exclusion chromatography, hydrodynamic chromatography and field flow fractionation. Mechanical separation techniques utilize membranes and/or centrifugation. Chemical separation techniques are liquid–liquid extraction, solid–liquid extraction, cloud point extraction, and the use of magnetic nanoparticles.

== Applications ==
=== Product verification ===
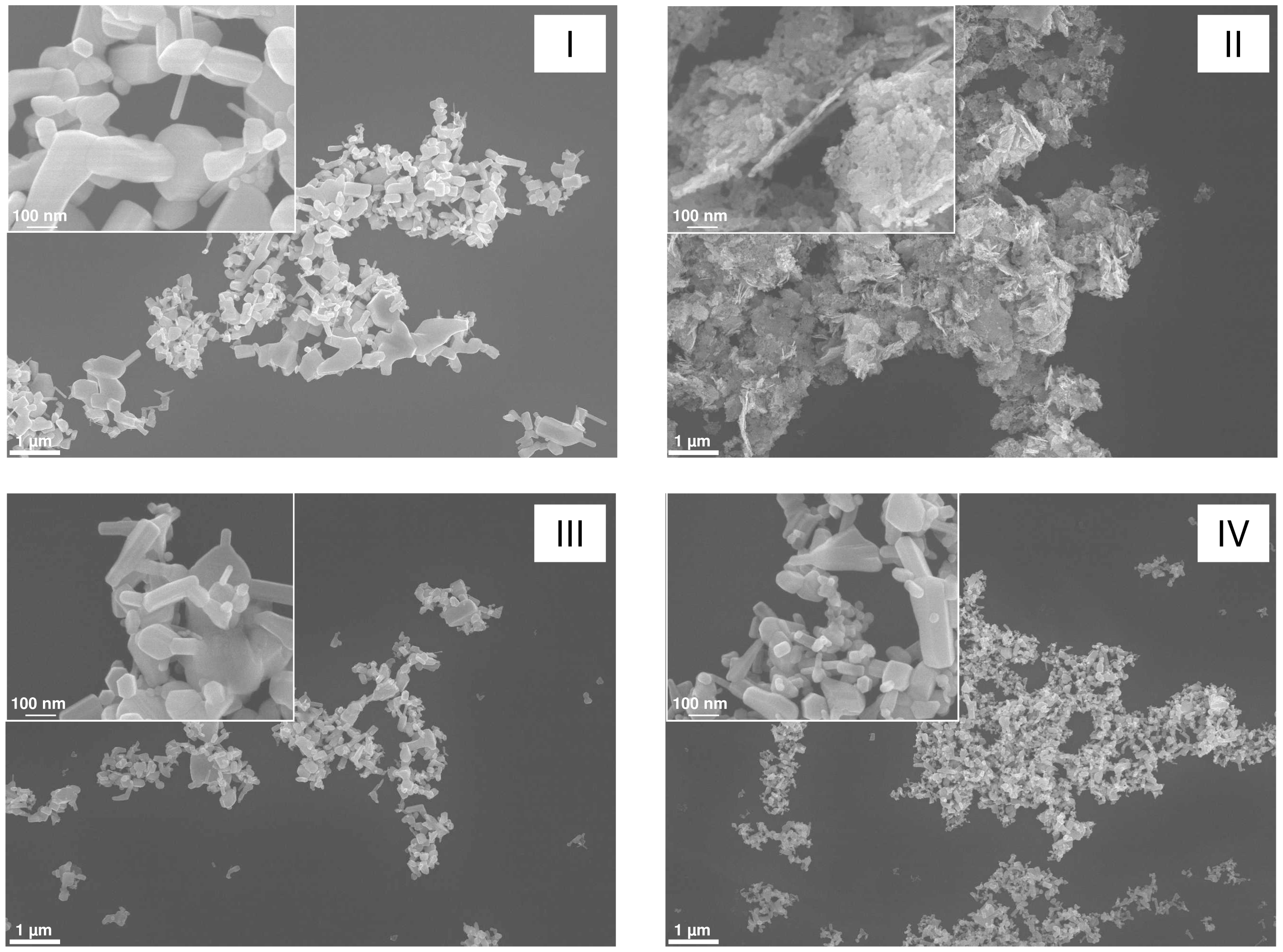
Scanning electron microscope images of four samples of zinc oxide nanoparticles from different vendors, showing differences in size and shape. Characterization of nanomaterials by manufacturers and users is important in assessing the uniformity and reproducibility of their properties.

Manufacturers and users of nanoparticles may perform characterization of their products for process control or verification and validation purposes. The properties of nanoparticles are sensitive to small variations in the processes used to synthesize and process them. Thus, nanoparticles prepared by seemingly identical processes must be characterized to determine if they are actually equivalent. Any material or dimensional property of a nanomaterial can be heterogeneous, and these can lead to heterogeneity in their functional properties. Generally, uniform collections are desired. It is advantageous to minimize heterogeneity during the initial synthesis, stabilization, and functionalization processes, rather than through downstream purification steps that decrease yield. Batch-to-batch reproducibility is also desirable. Unlike research-oriented nanometrology, industrial measurements emphasize reducing time, cost, and number of measured metrics, and must be performed under ambient conditions during a production process.

Different applications have different tolerances for uniformity and reproducibility, and require different approaches to characterization. For example, nanocomposite materials may be tolerant of a broad distribution of nanoparticle properties. By contrast, characterization is especially important for nanomedicines, as their efficacy and safety depends strongly on critical properties such as particle size distribution, chemical composition, and the kinetics of drug loading and release. The development of standardized analytical methods for nanomedicines is in its early stages. However, standardized lists of recommended tests called "assay cascades” have been developed to assist with this.

=== Toxicology ===
Nanotoxicology is the study of the toxic effects of nanoparticles on living organisms. Characterization of a nanoparticle's physical and chemical properties is important for ensuring the reproducibility of toxicology studies, and is also vital for studying how the physical and chemical properties of nanoparticles determine their biological effects.

The properties of a nanoparticle, such as size distribution and agglomeration state, can change as a material is prepared and used in toxicology studies. This makes it important to measure them at different points in the experiment. The "as-received" or "as-generated" properties refer to the material's state when received from the manufacturer or synthesized in the laboratory. The "as-dosed" or "as-exposed" properties refer to its state when administered to the biological system. These may differ from the "as-received" state due to formation of aggregates and agglomerates if the material has been in powder form, the settling out of larger aggregates and agglomerates, or loss by adhesion to surfaces. The properties may again be different at the point of interaction with the organism's tissues due to biodistribution and physiological clearance mechanisms. At this stage, it is difficult to measure nanoparticle properties in situ without perturbing the system. Post mortem or histological examination provides a way to measure these changes in the material, although the tissue itself can interfere with the measurements.

=== Exposure assessment ===
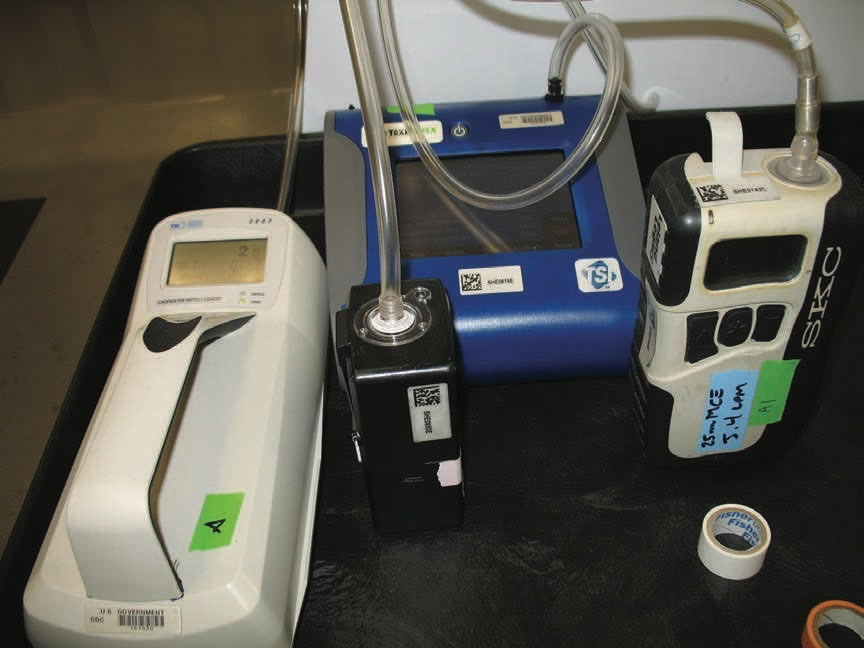
Equipment used for area sampling of airborne nanoparticles. The instruments shown here include a condensation particle counter (left), aerosol photometer (blue device at top), and two air sampling pumps for filter-based analysis.

Exposure assessment is a set of methods used to monitor contaminant release and exposures to workers and mitigate the health and safety hazards of nanomaterials in workplaces where they are handled. For engineered nanoparticles, the assessment often involves use of both real-time instruments such as particle counters, which monitor the total number of particles in air (including both the nanoparticle of interest and other background particles), and filter-based occupational hygiene sampling methods that use electron microscopy and elemental analysis to identify the nanoparticle of interest. Personal sampling locates the samplers in the personal breathing zone of the worker, as close to the nose and mouth as possible and usually attached to a shirt collar. Area sampling is where samplers are placed at static locations.

The U.S. National Institute for Occupational Safety and Health developed a Technical Report: Occupational Exposure Sampling for Engineered Nanomaterials which contains guidance for workplace sampling for three engineered nanomaterials: carbon nanotubes and nanofibers, silver, and titanium dioxide, each of which have an elemental mass-based NIOSH Recommended Exposure Limit (REL). In addition, NIOSH developed a practical approach to exposure sampling for other engineered nanomaterials that do not have exposure limits employing the Nanomaterial Exposure Assessment Technique (NEAT) 2.0, a sampling strategy that can be used to determine exposure potential for engineered nanoparticles. The NEAT 2.0 approach uses filter samples both in the worker's personal breathing zone and as area samples. Separate filter samples are used for elemental analysis, and to gather morphologic data from electron microscopy. The latter can provide an order of magnitude evaluation of the contribution of the nanoparticle of interest to the elemental mass load, as well as a qualitative assessment of the particle size, degree of agglomeration, and whether the nanoparticle is free or contained within a matrix. Hazard identification and characterization can then be performed based on a holistic assessment of the integrated filter samples. In addition, field-portable direct reading instruments can be used for continuous recording of normal fluctuations in particle count, size distribution, and mass. By documenting the workers' activities, data-logged results can then be used to identify workplace tasks or practices that contribute to any increase or spikes in the counts. The data need to be carefully interpreted, as direct reading instruments will identify the real-time quantity of all nanoparticles including any incidental background particles such as may occur from motor exhaust, pump exhaust, heating vessels, and other sources. Evaluation of worker practices, ventilation efficacy, and other engineering exposure control systems and risk management strategies serve to allow for a comprehensive exposure assessment.

To be effective, real-time particle counters should be able to detect a wide range of particle sizes, as nanoparticles may aggregate in the air. Adjacent work areas can be simultaneously tested to establish a background concentration. Not all instruments used to detect aerosols are suitable for monitoring occupational nanoparticle emissions because they may not be able to detect smaller particles, or may be too large or difficult to ship to a workplace. Some NIOSH methods developed for other chemicals can be used for off-line analysis of nanoparticles, including their morphology and geometry, elemental carbon content (relevant for carbon-based nanoparticles), and elemental analysis for several metals.

Occupational exposure limits have not yet been developed for many of the large and growing number of engineered nanoparticles now being produced and used, as their hazards are not fully known. While mass-based metrics are traditionally used to characterize toxicological effects of exposure to air contaminants, it remains unclear which metrics are most important with regard to engineered nanoparticles. Animal and cell-culture studies have shown that size and shape may be two major factors in their toxicological effects. Surface area and surface chemistry also appear to be more important than mass concentration. NIOSH has determined non-regulatory recommended exposure limits (RELs) of 1.0 μg/m^{3} for carbon nanotubes and carbon nanofibers as background-corrected elemental carbon as an 8-hour time-weighted average (TWA) respirable mass concentration, and 300 μg/m^{3} for ultrafine titanium dioxide as TWA concentrations for up to 10 hr/day during a 40-hour work week.

== Standards ==
Metrology standards for nanotechnology are available from both private organizations and government agencies. These include the International Organization for Standardization (ISO), ASTM International, the IEEE Standards Association (IEEE), the International Electrotechnical Commission (IEC), the International Union of Pure and Applied Chemistry, the U.S. National Institute of Standards and Technology (NIST), the U.S. National Cancer Institute's Nanotechnology Characterization Laboratory, and the European Committee for Standardization. The American National Standards Institute maintains a database of nanotechnology standards.

=== Reference materials ===
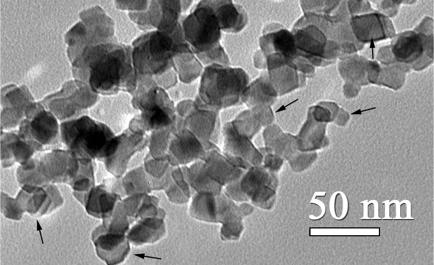
Transmission electron micrograph of titanium dioxide nanoparticles from NIST Standard Reference Material 1898

Reference materials are materials that are established or produced to be homogeneous and stable in at least one measurable physical property to provide a control measurement. Reference materials for nanoparticles can reduce measurement error that can contribute to uncertainty in their hazard properties in risk assessment. Reference materials can also be used for calibrating equipment used in nanoparticles characterization, for statistical quality control, and for comparing experiments run in different laboratories.

Many nanoparticles do not yet have reference materials available. Nanoparticles have the challenge that reference materials can only be generated when the measurement methods themselves can produce precise and reproducible measurements of the relevant physical property. Measurement conditions must also be specified, because properties such as size and dispersion state may change based on them, especially when there is a thermodynamic equilibrium between particlulate and dissolved matter. Reference materials of nanoparticles often have a shorter validity period than other materials. Those in powder form are more stable than those provided in suspensions, but the process of dispersing the powder increases uncertainty in its metrics.

Reference nanoparticles are produced by the U.S. National Institute of Standards and Technology, as well as the European Union Institute for Reference Materials and Measurements, the Japanese National Institute of Advanced Industrial Science and Technology, the Canadian National Research Council, the Chinese National Institute of Metrology, and Thermo Fisher Scientific. The German Federal Institute for Materials Research and Testing maintains a listing of nanoscale reference materials.
