= Equivalent spherical diameter =

Diameter of a sphere of the same volume as an irregularly-shaped subject

The equivalent spherical diameter of an irregularly shaped object is the diameter of a sphere of equivalent geometric, optical, electrical, aerodynamic or hydrodynamic behavior to that of the particle under investigation.

The particle size of a perfectly smooth, spherical object can be accurately defined by a single parameter, the particle diameter. However, real-life particles are likely to have irregular shapes and surface irregularities, and their size cannot be fully characterized by a single parameter.

The concept of equivalent spherical diameter has been introduced in the field of particle size analysis to enable the representation of the particle size distribution in a simplified, homogenized way. Here, the real-life particle is matched with an imaginary sphere which has the same properties according to a defined principle, enabling the real-life particle to be defined by the diameter of the imaginary sphere.

The principle used to match the real-life particle and the imaginary sphere vary as a function of the measurement technique used to measure the particle.

== Optical methods ==
For optical-based particle sizing methods such as microscopy or dynamic image analysis, the analysis is made on the projection of the three-dimensional object on a two-dimensional plane. The most commonly used methods for determining the equivalent spherical diameter from the particle's projected outline are:

- The Feret diameter D_{F}, which corresponds to the distance between two parallel tangents on opposite sides of the particle's projected image.
- The Martin diameter D_{M}, defined as the chord length of the outline of the particle, which bisects the area of particle projection. In other terms, it is the length of the line dividing the projection in two areas of equal surfaces.
- The area-equivalent diameter D_{A}, also termed circular-equivalent diameter, is the diameter of a sphere having the same projected area as the particle's projection. Enabled by the introduction of digital image analysis, this corresponds to a direct measurement of the projection area by pixel counting.

Since the particle's orientation at the time of image capture has a large influence on all these parameters, the equivalent spherical diameter is obtained by averaging a large number of measurements, corresponding to the different particle orientations.

Of note, the ISO standards providing guidance for performing particle size determination by static and dynamic image analysis (respectively ISO 13322-1 and 13322-2) recommend to define particle size by a combination of 3 primary measurements, namely the area-equivalent diameter, the maximum Feret diameter, and the minimum Feret diameter. The combination of these parameters is then used to define the shape factor.

== Sieving ==
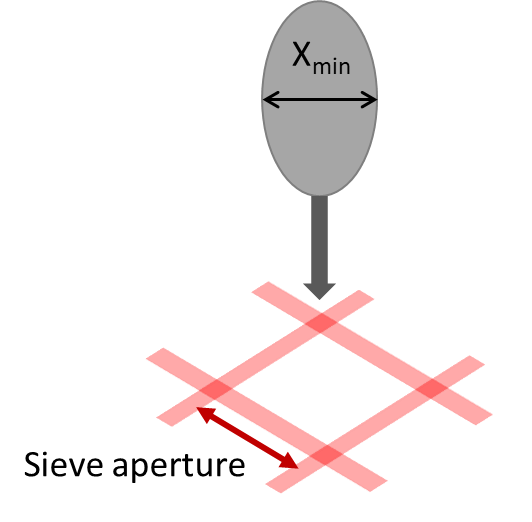
Equivalent spherical diameter for the sieve method

In sieve analysis, the particle size distribution of a granular material is assessed by letting the material pass through a series of sieves of progressively smaller mesh size. In that case the equivalent spherical diameter corresponds to the equivalent sieve diameter, or the diameter of a sphere that just passes through a defined sieve pore.

Of note, the equivalent sieve diameter can be significantly smaller than the area-equivalent diameter obtained by optical methods, as particles can pass the sieve apertures in an orientation corresponding to their smallest projection surface.

== Laser diffraction ==
Laser diffraction analysis is based on the observation that the angle of the light diffracted by a particle is inversely proportional to its size.

Strictly speaking, the laser diffraction equivalent diameter is the diameter of a sphere yielding, on the same detector geometry, the same diffraction pattern as the particle. In the size regimen where the Fraunhofer approximation is valid, this diameter corresponds to the projected area diameter of the particle in random orientation. For particles ≤ 0.1 μm, the definition can be extended into volume-equivalent diameter. In this case, the cross-sectional area becomes nearly the same as that of a sphere with equal volume. In addition, the favored mean particle size for laser diffraction results is the D[4,3] or De Brouckere mean diameter, which is typically applied to measurement techniques where the measured signal is proportional to the volume of the particles.

Hence, in a simplified way, the laser diffraction equivalent diameter is considered as a volume-equivalent spherical diameter, i.e., the diameter of a sphere of the same volume as that of the particle under investigation.

== Dynamic light scattering ==
Dynamic light scattering is based on the principle that light scattered by small particles (Rayleigh scattering) fluctuates as the particles undergo Brownian motion. The equivalent spherical diameter for the technique is termed hydrodynamic diameter (HDD). This corresponds to the diameter of a sphere with the same translational diffusion coefficient D as the particle, in the same fluid and under the same conditions. The relationship between the diffusion coefficient D and the HDD is defined by the Stokes–Einstein equation:

$$\mathrm{HDD} = \frac{k_\text{B}T}{3\pi\eta D}$$

where

- k_{B} is the Boltzmann constant
- T is the absolute temperature
- η is the dynamic viscosity of the dispersion medium

== Sedimentation ==
Particle size analysis techniques based on gravitational or centrifugal sedimentation (e.g., hydrometer technique used for soil texture, Soil Hydrometers) are based on Stokes’ law, and consist in calculating the size of particles from the speed at which they settle in a liquid.

In that case the equivalent spherical diameter is appropriately termed Stokes diameter, and corresponds to the diameter of a sphere having the same settling rate as the particle under conditions of Stokes’ law.

== See also ==
- Equivalent radius
- Mean radius (astronomy)
- Hydraulic diameter
- Index of sphericity
- Shape factor
- Sphericity
- Stokes radius
