= Nanometrology =

Metrology of nanomaterials

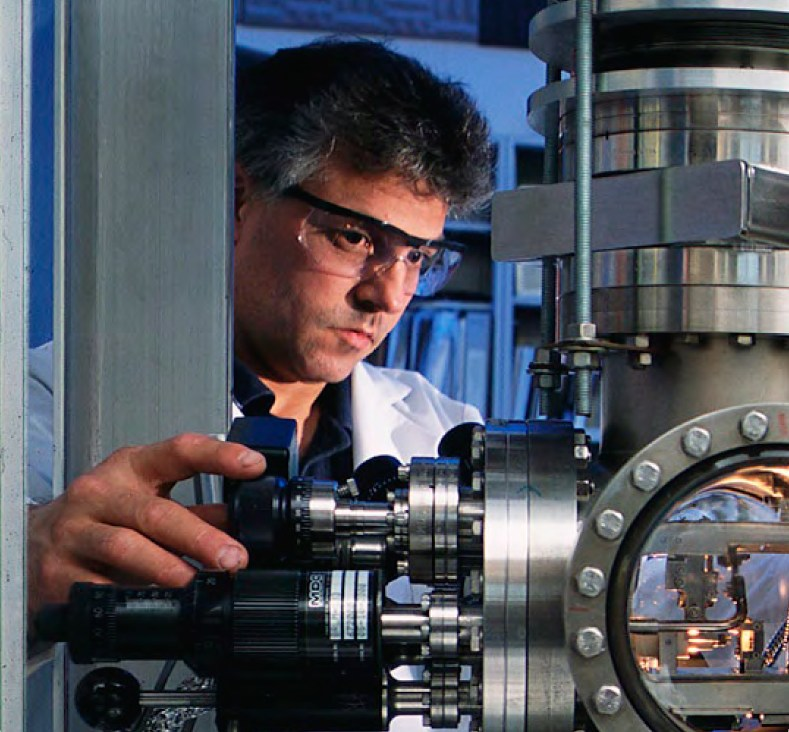
NIST Next-Generation Nanometrology research.

Nanometrology is a subfield of metrology, concerned with the science of measurement at the nanoscale level. Nanometrology has a crucial role in order to produce nanomaterials and devices with a high degree of accuracy and reliability in nanomanufacturing.

A challenge in this field is to develop or create new measurement techniques and standards to meet the needs of next-generation advanced manufacturing, which will rely on nanometer scale materials and technologies. The needs for measurement and characterization of new sample structures and characteristics far exceed the capabilities of current measurement science. Anticipated advances in emerging U.S. nanotechnology industries will require revolutionary metrology with higher resolution and accuracy than has previously been envisioned.

== Standards ==
=== International standards ===
Metrology standards are objects or ideas that are designated as being authoritative for some accepted reason. Whatever value they possess is useful for comparison to unknowns for the purpose of establishing or confirming an assigned value based on the standard. The execution of measurement comparisons for the purpose of establishing the relationship between a standard and some other measuring device is calibration. The ideal standard is independently reproducible without uncertainty. The worldwide market for products with nanotechnology applications is projected to be at least a couple of hundred billion dollars in the near future. Until recently, there almost no established internationally accepted standards for nanotechnology related field. The International Organization for Standardization TC-229 Technical Committee on Nanotechnology recently published few standards for terminology, characterization of nanomaterials and nanoparticles using measurement tools like AFM, SEM, Interferometers, optoacoustic tools, gas adsorption methods etc. Certain standards for standardization of measurements for electrical properties have been published by the International Electrotechnical Commission. Some important standards which are yet to be established are standards for measuring thickness of thin films or layers, characterization of surface features, standards for force measurement at nanoscale, standards for characterization of critical dimensions of nanoparticles and nanostructures and also Standards for measurement for physical properties like conductivity, elasticity etc.

=== National standards ===
Because of the importance of nanotechnology in the future, countries around the world have programmes to establish national standards for nanometrology and nanotechnology. These programmes are run by the national standard agencies of the respective countries. In the United States, National Institute of Standards and Technology has been working on developing new techniques for measurement at nanoscale and has also established some national standards for nanotechnology. These standards are for nanoparticle characterization, Roughness Characterization, magnification standard, calibration standards etc.

=== Calibration ===
It is difficult to provide samples using which precision instruments can be calibrated at nanoscale. Reference or calibration standards are important for repeatability to be ensured. But there are no international standards for calibration and the calibration artefacts provided by the company along with their equipment is only good for calibrating that particular equipment. Hence it is difficult to select a universal calibration artefact using which we can achieve repeatability at nanoscale. At nanoscale while calibrating care needs to be taken for influence of external factors like vibration, noise, motions caused by thermal drift and creep, nonlinear behaviour and hysteresis of piezoscanner and internal factors like the interaction between the artefact and the equipment which can cause significant deviations.

== Traceability ==
In metrology at macro scale achieving traceability is quite easy and artefacts like scales, laser interferometers, step gauges, and straight edges are used. At nanoscale a crystalline highly oriented pyrolytic graphite (HOPG), mica or silicon surface is considered suitable used as calibration artefact for achieving traceability.

== Classification of nanostructures ==
There are a variety of nanostructures like nanocomposites, nanowires, nanopowders, nanotubes, fullerenes nanofibers, nanocages, nanocrystallites, nanoneedles, nanofoams, nanomeshes, nanoparticles, nanopillars, thin films, nanorods, nanofabrics, quantumdots etc. The most common way to classify nano structures is by their dimensions.

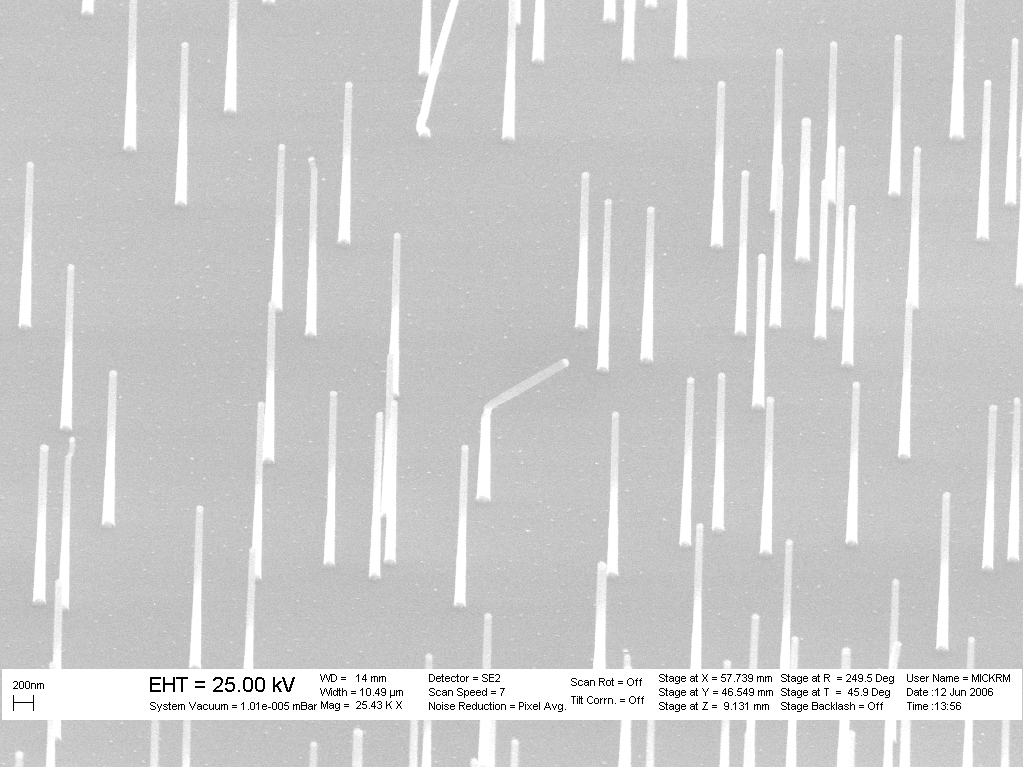
SEM of nanowire.

=== Dimensional classification ===
Dimensions	Criteria	Examples
Zero-dimensional (0-D)	The nanostructure has all dimensions in the nanometer range.	Nanoparticles, quantum dots, nanodots
One-dimensional (1-D)	One dimension of the nanostructure is outside the nanometer range.	Nanowires, nanorods, nanotubes
Two-dimensional (2-D)	Two dimensions of the nanostructure are outside the nanometer range.	Coatings, thin-film-multilayers
Three-dimensional (3-D)	Three dimensions of the nanostructure are outside the nanometer range.	Bulk

=== Classification of grain structure ===
Nanostructures can be classified on the basis of the grain structure and size there are made up of. This is applicable in the cas of 2-dimensional and 3-Dimensional Nanostructurs.

== See also ==
- Characterization of nanoparticles
