= Stokes's law =

Equation for the velocity of a body in viscous fluid

In fluid dynamics, Stokes's law gives the frictional force – also called drag force – exerted on spherical objects moving at very small Reynolds numbers in a viscous fluid. It was derived by George Gabriel Stokes in 1851 by solving the Stokes flow limit for small Reynolds numbers of the Navier–Stokes equations.

== Statement of the law ==
The force of viscosity on a small sphere moving through a viscous fluid is given by:

$${\vec F}_{\rm d} = - 6 \pi \mu R {\vec v}$$

where (in SI units):

- ${\vec F}_{\rm d}$ is the frictional force – known as Stokes's drag – acting on the interface between the fluid and the particle (newtons, kg m s^{−2});
- μ (some authors use the symbol η) is the dynamic viscosity (Pascal-seconds, kg m^{−1} s^{−1});
- R is the radius of the spherical object (meters);
- ${\vec v}$ is the body velocity vector, not the flow velocity relative to the object (meters per second). Note the minus sign in the equation, the drag force points in the opposite direction to the relative velocity: drag opposes the motion.

Stokes's law makes the following assumptions for the behavior of a particle in a fluid:

- Laminar flow
- No inertial effects (zero Reynolds number)
- Spherical particles
- Homogeneous (uniform in composition) material
- Smooth surfaces
- Particles do not interfere with each other.

Depending on desired accuracy, the failure to meet these assumptions may or may not require the use of a more complicated model. To 10% error, for instance, velocities need be limited to those giving Re < 1.

For molecules Stokes's law is used to define their Stokes radius and diameter.

The CGS unit of kinematic viscosity was named "stokes" after his work.

== Applications ==
Stokes's law is the basis of the falling-sphere viscometer, in which the fluid is stationary in a vertical glass tube. A sphere of known size and density is allowed to descend through the liquid. If correctly selected, it reaches terminal velocity, which can be measured by the time it takes to pass two marks on the tube. Electronic sensing can be used for opaque fluids. Knowing the terminal velocity, the size and density of the sphere, and the density of the liquid, Stokes's law can be used to calculate the viscosity of the fluid. A series of steel ball bearings of different diameters are normally used in the classic experiment to improve the accuracy of the calculation. The school experiment uses glycerine or golden syrup as the fluid, and the technique is used industrially to check the viscosity of fluids used in processes. Several school experiments often involve varying the temperature and/or concentration of the substances used in order to demonstrate the effects this has on the viscosity. Industrial methods include many different oils, and polymer liquids such as solutions.

The importance of Stokes's law is illustrated by the fact that it played a critical role in the research leading to at least three Nobel Prizes.

Stokes's law is important for understanding the swimming of microorganisms and sperm; also, the sedimentation of small particles and organisms in water, under the force of gravity.

In air, the same theory can be used to explain why small water droplets (or ice crystals) can remain suspended in air (as clouds) until they grow to a critical size and start falling as rain (or snow and hail). Similar use of the equation can be made in the settling of fine particles in water or other fluids.

=== Terminal velocity of sphere falling in a fluid ===
Creeping flow past a falling sphere in a fluid (e.g., a droplet of fog falling through the air): streamlines, drag force F_{d} and force by gravity F_{g}.

At terminal (or settling) velocity, the excess force F_{e} due to the difference between the weight and buoyancy of the sphere (both caused by gravity) is given by:

$$F_e = ( \rho_p - \rho_f)\, g\, \frac{4}{3}\pi\, R^3,$$

where (in SI units):

- ρ_{p} is the mass density of the sphere [kg/m^{3}]
- ρ_{f} is the mass density of the fluid [kg/m^{3}]
- g is the gravitational acceleration [m/s^{2}]

Requiring the force balance F_{d} = F_{e} and solving for the velocity v gives the terminal velocity v_{s}. Note that since the excess force increases as R^{3} and Stokes's drag increases as R, the terminal velocity increases as R^{2} and thus varies greatly with particle size as shown below. If a particle only experiences its own weight while falling in a viscous fluid, then a terminal velocity is reached when the sum of the frictional and the buoyant forces on the particle due to the fluid exactly balances the gravitational force. This velocity v [m/s] is given by:

$$v = \frac{2}{9}\frac{ \rho_p - \rho_f} \mu g\, R^2 \quad
\begin{cases}
\rho_p > \rho_f & \implies \vec{v} \text{ vertically downwards} \\
\rho_p < \rho_f & \implies \vec{v} \text{ vertically upwards}
\end{cases}$$

where (in SI units):

- g is the gravitational field strength [m/s^{2}]
- R is the radius of the spherical particle [m]
- ρ_{p} is the mass density of the particle [kg/m^{3}]
- ρ_{f} is the mass density of the fluid [kg/m^{3}]
- μ is the dynamic viscosity [kg/(m•s)].

== Derivation ==
=== Stokes flow ===
In Stokes flow, at very low Reynolds number, the convective acceleration terms in the Navier–Stokes equations are neglected. Then the flow equations become, for an incompressible steady flow:

$$\begin{align}
&\nabla p = \mu\, \nabla^2 \mathbf{u} = - \mu\, \nabla \times \mathbf{ \boldsymbol{\omega} }, \\[2pt]
&\nabla \cdot \mathbf{u} = 0,
\end{align}$$

where:

- p is the fluid pressure (in Pa),
- u is the flow velocity (in m/s), and
- ω is the vorticity (in s^{−1}), defined as $\boldsymbol{\omega}=\nabla\times\mathbf{u}.$

By using some vector calculus identities, these equations can be shown to result in Laplace's equations for the pressure and each of the components of the vorticity vector:

$\nabla^2 \boldsymbol{\omega}=0$ and $\nabla^2 p = 0.$

Additional forces like those by gravity and buoyancy have not been taken into account, but can easily be added since the above equations are linear, so linear superposition of solutions and associated forces can be applied.

=== Transversal flow around a sphere ===
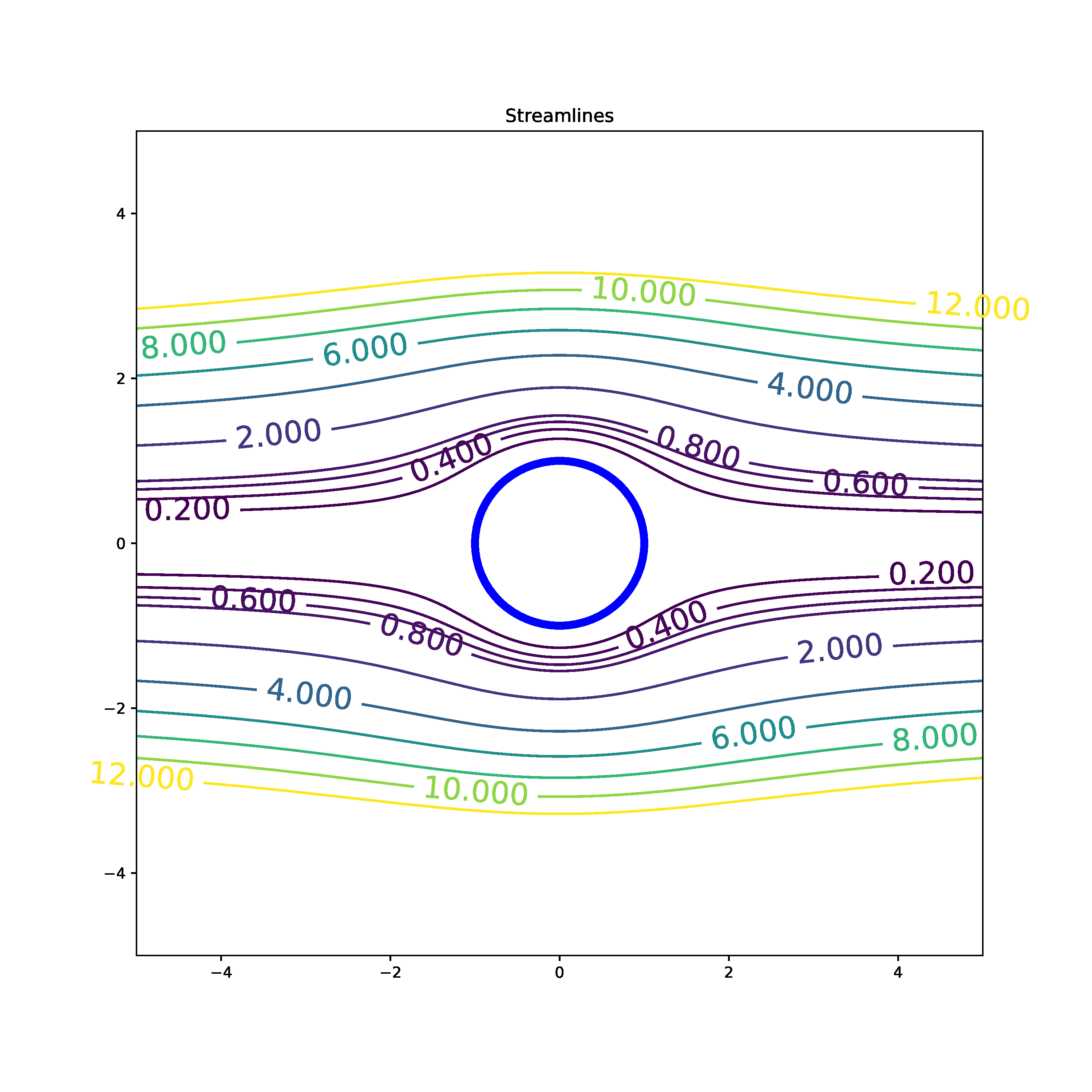
Streamlines of creeping flow past a sphere in a fluid. Isocontours of the ψ function (values in contour labels).

For the case of a sphere in a uniform far field flow, it is advantageous to use a cylindrical coordinate system (r, φ, z). The z–axis is through the centre of the sphere and aligned with the mean flow direction, while r is the radius as measured perpendicular to the z–axis. The origin is at the sphere centre. Because the flow is axisymmetric around the z–axis, it is independent of the azimuth φ.

In this cylindrical coordinate system, the incompressible flow can be described with a Stokes stream function ψ, depending on r and z:

$$u_z = \frac{1}{r}\frac{\partial\psi}{\partial r},
\qquad
u_r = -\frac{1}{r}\frac{\partial\psi}{\partial z},$$

with u_{r} and u_{z} the flow velocity components in the r and z direction, respectively. The azimuthal velocity component in the φ–direction is equal to zero, in this axisymmetric case. The volume flux, through a tube bounded by a surface of some constant value ψ, is equal to 2πψ and is constant.

For this case of an axisymmetric flow, the only non-zero component of the vorticity vector ω is the azimuthal φ–component ω_{φ}

$$\omega_\varphi = \frac{\partial u_r}{\partial z} - \frac{\partial u_z}{\partial r}
= - \frac{\partial}{\partial r} \left( \frac{1}{r}\frac{\partial\psi}{\partial r} \right) - \frac{1}{r}\, \frac{\partial^2\psi}{\partial z^2}.$$

The Laplace operator, applied to the vorticity ω_{φ}, becomes in this cylindrical coordinate system with axisymmetry:

$$\nabla^2 \omega_\varphi = \frac{1}{r}\frac{\partial}{\partial r}\left( r\, \frac{\partial\omega_\varphi}{\partial r} \right) + \frac{\partial^2 \omega_\varphi}{\partial z^2} - \frac{\omega_\varphi}{r^{2}} = 0.$$

From the previous two equations, and with the appropriate boundary conditions, for a far-field uniform-flow velocity u in the z–direction and a sphere of radius R, the solution is found to be

$$\psi(r,z) = - \frac{1}{2}\, u\, r^2\, \left[
1
- \frac{3}{2} \frac{R}{\sqrt{r^2+z^2}}
+ \frac{1}{2} \left( \frac{R}{\sqrt{r^2+z^2}} \right)^3\;
\right].$$

The solution of velocity in cylindrical coordinates and components follows as:

$$\begin{align}
u_r(r, z) &= \frac{3R r z u}{4 \sqrt{r^2 + z^2}} \left( \left( \frac{R}{r^2+z^2} \right)^2 - \frac{1}{r^2+z^2} \right) \\[4pt]
u_z(r, z) &= u + \frac{3Ru}{4 \sqrt{r^2 + z^2}} \left(
\frac{2 R^2 + 3 r^2}{3 (r^2 + z^2)}
-\left(\frac{r R}{r^2 + z^2}\right)^2
- 2
\right)
\end{align}$$

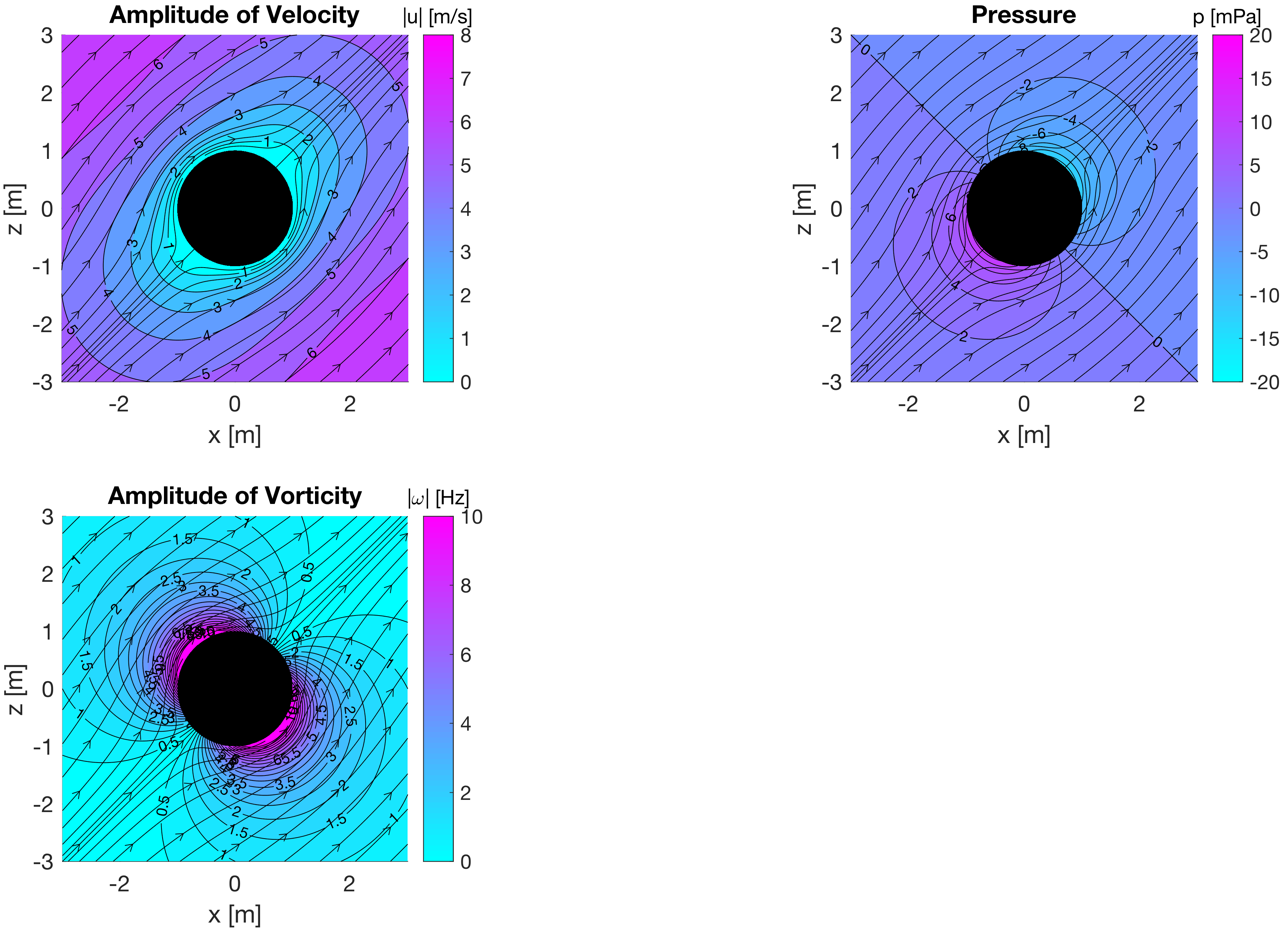
Stokes-Flow around sphere with parameters of Far-Field velocity $$\mathbf{u}_{\infty} = \begin{pmatrix} 6 & 0 & 6  \end{pmatrix}^T \text{m/s}$$, radius of sphere $R = 1 \; \text{m}$, viscosity of water (T = 20°C) $\mu = 1 \; \text{mPa}\cdot \text{s}$. Shown are the field-lines of velocity-field and the amplitudes of velocity, pressure and vorticity with pseudo-colors.

The solution of vorticity in cylindrical coordinates follows as:

$$\omega_\varphi(r, z) = - \frac{3 Ru}{2} \cdot \frac{r}{\sqrt{r^2+z^2}^3}$$

The solution of pressure in cylindrical coordinates follows as:

$$p(r, z) = - \frac{3 \mu R u}{2} \cdot \frac{z}{\sqrt{r^2+z^2}^3}$$

The solution of pressure in spherical coordinates follows as:

$$p(r, \theta) = - \frac{3\mu R u}{2} \cdot \frac{\cos\theta}{r^2}$$

The formula of pressure is also called dipole potential analogous to the concept in electrostatics.

A more general formulation, with arbitrary far-field velocity-vector $\mathbf{u}_{\infty}$, in cartesian coordinates $\mathbf{x}= (x, y, z)^T$ follows with:
$$\begin{align}
\mathbf{u}(\mathbf{x})
&= \underbrace{\underbrace{\frac{R^3}{4} \cdot \left(\frac{3 \left(\mathbf{u}_{\infty} \cdot \mathbf{x}\right)\cdot \mathbf{x}}{\|\mathbf{x}\|^5} - \frac{\mathbf{u}_{\infty}}{\|\mathbf{x}\|^3} \right)}_{\text{conservative: curl=0,}\ \nabla^2\mathbf{u}=0} + \underbrace{\mathbf{u}_{\infty}}_{\text{far-field}}}_{\text{Terms of Boundary-Condition}} \; \underbrace{- \frac{3R}{4}\cdot\left( \frac{\mathbf{u}_{\infty}}{\|\mathbf{x}\|} + \frac{\left(\mathbf{u}_{\infty} \cdot \mathbf{x}\right)\cdot \mathbf{x}}{\|\mathbf{x}\|^3}  \right)}_{\text{non-conservative: curl}=\boldsymbol{\omega}(\mathbf{x}),\ \mu\nabla^2\mathbf{u}=\nabla p} \\[8pt]
&=
\left[
\frac{3R^3}{4} \frac{\mathbf{x\otimes\mathbf{x}}}{\|\mathbf{x}\|^5}
- \frac{R^3}{4} \frac{\mathbf{I}}{\|\mathbf{x}\|^3}
- \frac{3R}{4} \frac{\mathbf{x}\otimes\mathbf{x}}{\|\mathbf{x}\|^3}
- \frac{3R}{4} \frac{\mathbf{I}}{\|\mathbf{x}\|}
+ \mathbf{I}
\right]\cdot \mathbf{u}_{\infty}
\end{align}$$

$$\boldsymbol{\omega}(\mathbf{x}) = -  \frac{3R}{2} \cdot \frac{\mathbf{u}_{\infty}\times \mathbf{x}}{\|\mathbf{x}\|^3}$$

$$p\left(\mathbf{x}\right)= - \frac{3\mu R}{2} \cdot \frac{\mathbf{u}_{\infty} \cdot \mathbf{x}}{\|\mathbf{x}\|^3}$$

In this formulation the non-conservative term represents a kind of so-called Stokeslet. The Stokeslet is the Green's function of the Stokes-Flow-Equations. The conservative term is equal to the dipole gradient field. The formula of vorticity is analogous to the Biot–Savart law in electromagnetism.

Alternatively, in a more compact way, one can formulate the velocity field as follows:

$$\mathbf{u}(\mathbf{x})
= \left[
\mathbf{I}
+  \mathrm{H} \left(\frac{R^3}{4}\frac{1}{\|\mathbf{x}\|}\right)
- \mathrm{S}\left(\frac{3R}{4} \|\mathbf{x}\|\right)
\right] \cdot \mathbf{u}_{\infty}
, \quad \|\mathbf{x}\| \ge R$$,

where $\mathrm{H} = \nabla\otimes\nabla$ is the Hessian matrix differential operator and $\mathrm{S} = \mathbf{I} \nabla^2 - \mathrm{H}$ is a differential operator composed as the difference of the Laplacian and the Hessian. In this way it becomes explicitly clear, that the solution is composed from derivatives of a Coulomb potential ($1/\|\mathbf{x}\|$) and a Biharmonic potential ($\|\mathbf{x}\|$). The differential operator $\mathrm{S}$ applied to the vector norm $\|\mathbf{x}\|$ generates the Stokeslet.

The following formula describes the viscous stress tensor for the special case of Stokes flow. It is needed in the calculation of the force acting on the particle. In Cartesian coordinates the vector-gradient $\nabla \mathbf{u}$ is identical to the Jacobian matrix. The matrix I represents the identity matrix.

$$\boldsymbol{\sigma} = - p \cdot \mathbf{I} + \mu \cdot \left((\nabla \mathbf{u}) + (\nabla \mathbf{u})^T \right)$$

The force acting on the sphere can be calculated via the integral of the stress tensor over the surface of the sphere, where e_{r} represents the radial unit-vector of spherical-coordinates:

$$\begin{align}
\mathbf{F} &= \iint_{\partial V}\!\!\!\!\!\!\!\!\!\!\!\!\!\!\subset\!\supset \;\boldsymbol{\sigma}\cdot \text{d}\mathbf{S} \\[4pt]
&=  \int_{0}^{\pi}\int_{0}^{2\pi} \boldsymbol{\sigma}\cdot \mathbf{e_r}\cdot R^2 \sin\theta \text{d}\varphi\text{d}\theta \\[4pt]
&=  \int_{0}^{\pi}\int_{0}^{2\pi}  \frac{3\mu \cdot \mathbf{u}_{\infty}}{2 R}\cdot R^2 \sin\theta \text{d}\varphi\text{d}\theta \\[4pt]
&= 6\pi\mu R \cdot \mathbf{u}_{\infty}
\end{align}$$

=== Rotational flow around a sphere ===
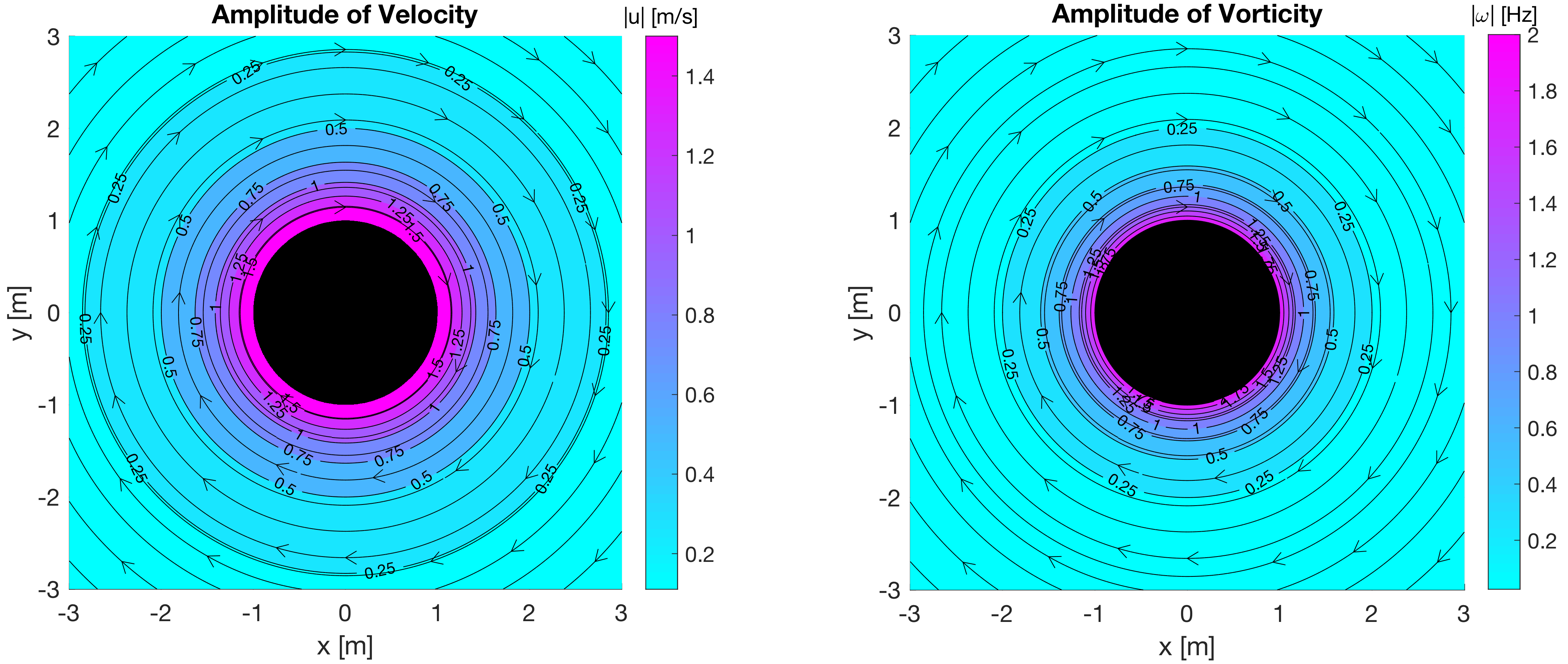
Stokes-Flow around sphere: $$\boldsymbol{\omega}_R = \begin{pmatrix} 0 & 0 & 2 \end{pmatrix}^T \; \text{Hz}$$, $\mu = 1 \; \text{mPa} \cdot \text{s}$, $R = 1 \; \text{m}$

$$\begin{align}
\mathbf{u}(\mathbf{x}) &= - \;R^3 \cdot \frac{  \boldsymbol{\omega}_{R} \times  \mathbf{x}}{\|\mathbf{x}\|^3} \\[8pt]
\boldsymbol{\omega}(\mathbf{x}) &= \frac{R^3 \cdot \boldsymbol{\omega}_{R}}{\|\mathbf{x}\|^3} -  \frac{3 R^3 \cdot (\boldsymbol{\omega}_{R} \cdot \mathbf{x})\cdot \mathbf{x}}{\|\mathbf{x}\|^5} \\[8pt]
p(\mathbf{x}) &= 0 \\[8pt]
\boldsymbol{\sigma} &= - p \cdot \mathbf{I} + \mu \cdot \left( (\nabla \mathbf{u}) + (\nabla \mathbf{u})^T \right) \\[8pt]
\mathbf{T} &= \iint_{\partial V}\!\!\!\!\!\!\!\!\!\!\!\!\!\!\subset\!\supset \mathbf{x} \times \left( \boldsymbol{\sigma} \cdot \text{d}\boldsymbol{S} \right) \\
&= \int_{0}^{\pi} \int_{0}^{2\pi}  (R \cdot \mathbf{e_r}) \times \left( \boldsymbol{\sigma} \cdot \mathbf{e_r} \cdot R^2 \sin\theta \text{d}\varphi \text{d}\theta \right) \\
&= 8\pi\mu R^3  \cdot \boldsymbol{\omega}_{R}
\end{align}$$

== Other types of Stokes flow ==
Although the liquid is static and the sphere is moving with a certain velocity, with respect to the frame of sphere, the sphere is at rest and liquid is flowing in the opposite direction to the motion of the sphere.

== See also ==
- Einstein relation (kinetic theory)
- Scientific laws named after people
- Ballistics
- Drag equation
- Viscometry
- Equivalent spherical diameter
- Deposition (geology)
- Stokes number – A determinant of the additional effect of turbulence on terminal fall velocity for particles in fluids

== Sources ==
- Batchelor, G.K. (1967). An Introduction to Fluid Dynamics. Cambridge University Press. ISBN 0-521-66396-2.
- Lamb, H. (1994). Hydrodynamics (6th ed.). Cambridge University Press. ISBN 978-0-521-45868-9. Originally published in 1879, the 6th extended edition appeared first in 1932.
