= Shape factor =

Shape factor refers to a value that is affected by an object's shape but is independent of its dimensions. It may refer to one of number of values in physics, engineering, image analysis, or statistics.

In physics:

- Shape factor, or shaping factor, a performance measure for filters such as band-pass filters
- Shape factor of crystallites, a term in the Scherrer equation used in X-ray diffraction
- The view factor in the field of radiative heat transfer

In engineering:

- Shape factor (boundary layer flow)
- Structural indices derived from falling weight deflectometer data

In image analysis:

- Shape factor (image analysis and microscopy) including:
  - The compactness measure of a shape

In statistics:

- The shape parameter, sometimes referred to as the shape factor, of some probability distributions
