= Nanotoxicology =

Study of the toxicity of nanomaterials

Nanotoxicology is the study of the toxicity of nanomaterials. Because of quantum size effects and large surface area to volume ratio, nanomaterials have unique properties compared with their larger counterparts that affect their toxicity. Of the possible hazards, inhalation exposure appears to present the most concern, with animal studies showing pulmonary effects such as inflammation, fibrosis, and carcinogenicity for some nanomaterials. Skin contact and ingestion exposure are also a concern.

== Background ==
Nanomaterials have at least one primary dimension of less than 100 nanometers, and often have properties different from those of their bulk components that are technologically useful. Because nanotechnology is a recent development, the health and safety effects of exposures to nanomaterials, and what levels of exposure may be acceptable, is not yet fully understood. Nanoparticles can be divided into combustion-derived nanoparticles (like diesel soot), manufactured nanoparticles like carbon nanotubes and naturally occurring nanoparticles from volcanic eruptions, atmospheric chemistry etc. Typical nanoparticles that have been studied are titanium dioxide, alumina, zinc oxide, carbon black, carbon nanotubes, and buckminsterfullerene.

Nanotoxicology is a sub-specialty of particle toxicology. Nanomaterials appear to have toxicity effects that are unusual and not seen with larger particles, and these smaller particles can pose more of a threat to the human body due to their ability to move with a much higher level of freedom while the body is designed to attack larger particles rather than those of the nanoscale. For example, even inert elements like gold become highly active at nanometer dimensions. Nanotoxicological studies are intended to determine whether and to what extent these properties may pose a threat to the environment and to human beings. Nanoparticles have much larger surface area to unit mass ratios which in some cases may lead to greater pro-inflammatory effects in, for example, lung tissue. In addition, some nanoparticles seem to be able to translocate from their site of deposition to distant sites such as the blood and the brain.

Nanoparticles can be inhaled, swallowed, absorbed through skin and deliberately or accidentally injected during medical procedures. They might be accidentally or inadvertently released from materials implanted into living tissue. One study considers release of airborne engineered nanoparticles at workplaces, and associated worker exposure from various production and handling activities, to be very probable.

== Properties that affect toxicity ==
Size is a key factor in determining the potential toxicity of a particle. However it is not the only important factor. Other properties of nanomaterials that influence toxicity include: chemical composition, shape, surface structure, surface charge, aggregation and solubility, and the presence or absence of functional groups of other chemicals. The large number of variables influencing toxicity means that it is difficult to generalise about health risks associated with exposure to nanomaterials – each new nanomaterial must be assessed individually and all material properties must be taken into account.

=== Composition ===
==== Metal-based ====
Metal based nanoparticles (NPs) are a prominent class of NPs synthesized for their functions as semiconductors, electroluminescents, and thermoelectric materials. Biomedically, these antibacterial NPs have been utilized in drug delivery systems to access areas previously inaccessible to conventional medicine. With the recent increase in interest and development of nanotechnology, many studies have been performed to assess whether the unique characteristics of these NPs, namely their large surface area to volume ratio, might negatively impact the environment upon which they were introduced. Researchers have found that some metal and metal oxide NPs may affect cells inducing DNA breakage and oxidation, mutations, reduced cell viability, warped morphology, induced apoptosis and necrosis, and decreased proliferation. Moreover, metal nanoparticles may persist in the organisms after administration if not carefully engineered.

==== Carbon-based ====
The latest toxicology studies on mice as of 2013 involving exposure to carbon nanotubes (CNT) showed a limited pulmonary inflammatory potential of MWCNT at levels corresponding to the average inhalable elemental carbon concentrations observed in U.S.-based CNT facilities. The study estimated that considerable years of exposure are necessary for significant pathology to occur.

One review concludes that the evidence gathered since the discovery of fullerenes overwhelmingly points to C_{60} being non-toxic. As is the case for toxicity profile with any chemical modification of a structural moiety, the authors suggest that individual molecules be assessed individually.

==== Other ====
Other classes of nanomaterials include polymers such as nanocellulose, and dendrimers.

=== Size ===
There are many ways that size can affect the toxicity of a nanoparticle. For example, particles of different sizes can deposit in different places in the lungs, and are cleared from the lungs at different rates. Size can also affect the particles' reactivity and the specific mechanism by which they are toxic.

=== Dispersion state ===
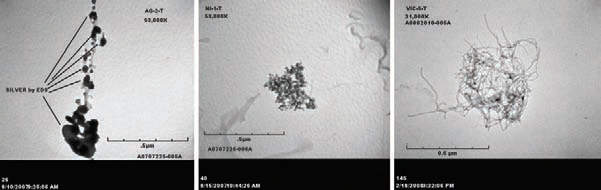
Nanomaterials present in aerosol particles are often in an agglomerated or aggregated state, which affects their toxicological properties. The examples shown here are silver nanoparticles, nickel nanoparticles, and multiwalled carbon nanotubes.

Many nanoparticles agglomerate or aggregate when they are placed in environmental or biological fluids. The terms agglomeration and aggregation have distinct definitions according to the standards organizations ISO and ASTM, where agglomeration signifies more loosely bound particles and aggregation signifies very tightly bound or fused particles (typically occurring during synthesis or drying). Nanoparticles frequently agglomerate due to the high ionic strength of environmental and biological fluids, which shields the repulsion due to charges on the nanoparticles. Unfortunately, agglomeration has frequently been ignored in nanotoxicity studies, even though agglomeration would be expected to affect nanotoxicity since it changes the size, surface area, and sedimentation properties of the nanoparticles. In addition, many nanoparticles will agglomerate to some extent in the environment or in the body before they reach their target, so it is desirable to study how toxicity is affected by agglomeration.

The agglomeration/deagglomeration (mechanical stability) potentials of airborne engineered nanoparticle clusters also have significant influences on their size distribution profiles at the end-point of their environmental transport routes. Different aerosolization and deagglomeration systems have been established to test stability of nanoparticle agglomerates.

=== Surface chemistry and charge ===
NPs, in their implementation, are covered with coatings and sometimes given positive or negative charges depending upon the intended function. Studies have found that these external factors affect the degree of toxicity of NPs.

== Routes of administration ==
=== Respiratory ===
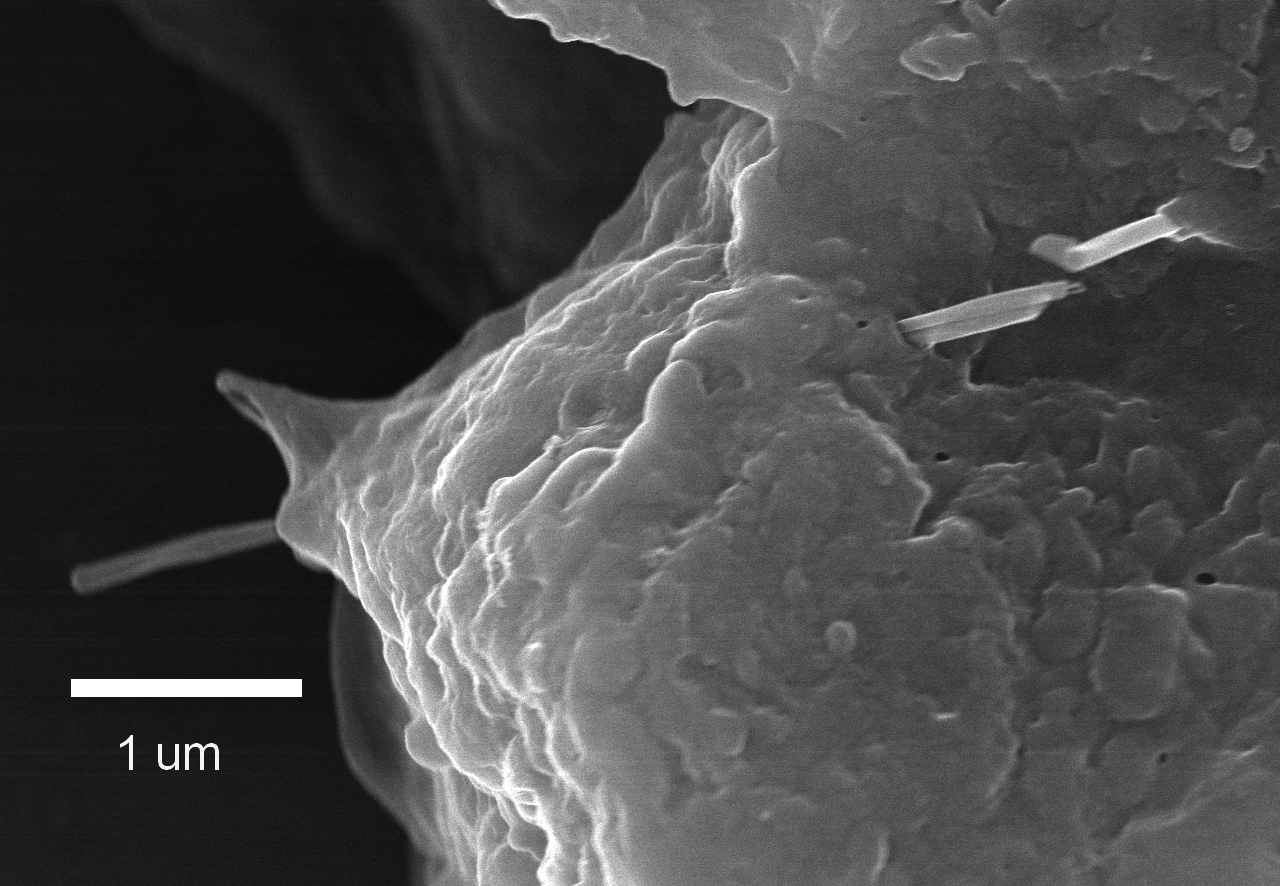
A scanning electron microscope image of bundles of multiwalled carbon nanotube piercing an alveolar epithelial cell.

Inhalation exposure is the most common route of exposure to airborne particles in the workplace. The deposition of nanoparticles in the respiratory tract is determined by the shape and size of particles or their agglomerates, and they are deposited in the lungs to a greater extent than larger respirable particles. Based on animal studies, nanoparticles may enter the bloodstream from the lungs and translocate to other organs, including the brain. The inhalation risk is affected by the dustiness of the material, the tendency of particles to become airborne in response to a stimulus. Dust generation is affected by the particle shape, size, bulk density, and inherent electrostatic forces, and whether the nanomaterial is a dry powder or incorporated into a slurry or liquid suspension.

Animal studies indicate that carbon nanotubes and carbon nanofibers can cause pulmonary effects including inflammation, granulomas, and pulmonary fibrosis, which were of similar or greater potency when compared with other known fibrogenic materials such as silica, asbestos, and ultrafine carbon black. Some studies in cells or animals have shown genotoxic or carcinogenic effects, or systemic cardiovascular effects from pulmonary exposure. Although the extent to which animal data may predict clinically significant lung effects in workers is not known, the toxicity seen in the short-term animal studies indicate a need for protective action for workers exposed to these nanomaterials. As of 2013, further research was needed in long-term animal studies and epidemiologic studies in workers. No reports of actual adverse health effects in workers using or producing these nanomaterials were known as of 2013. Titanium dioxide (TiO_{2}) dust is considered a lung tumor risk, with ultrafine (nanoscale) particles having an increased mass-based potency relative to fine TiO_{2}, through a secondary genotoxicity mechanism that is not specific to TiO_{2} but primarily related to particle size and surface area.

=== Dermal ===
Some studies suggest that nanomaterials could potentially enter the body through intact skin during occupational exposure. Studies have shown that particles smaller than 1 μm in diameter may penetrate into mechanically flexed skin samples, and that nanoparticles with varying physicochemical properties were able to penetrate the intact skin of pigs. Factors such as size, shape, water solubility, and surface coating directly affect a nanoparticle's potential to penetrate the skin. At this time, it is not fully known whether skin penetration of nanoparticles would result in adverse effects in animal models, although topical application of raw SWCNT to nude mice has been shown to cause dermal irritation, and in vitro studies using primary or cultured human skin cells have shown that carbon nanotubes can enter cells and cause release of pro-inflammatory cytokines, oxidative stress, and decreased viability. It remains unclear, however, how these findings may be extrapolated to a potential occupational risk. In addition, nanoparticles may enter the body through wounds, with particles migrating into the blood and lymph nodes.

=== Gastrointestinal ===
Ingestion can occur from unintentional hand-to-mouth transfer of materials; this has been found to happen with traditional materials, and it is scientifically reasonable to assume that it also could happen during handling of nanomaterials. Ingestion may also accompany inhalation exposure because particles that are cleared from the respiratory tract via the mucociliary escalator may be swallowed.

== Biodistribution ==
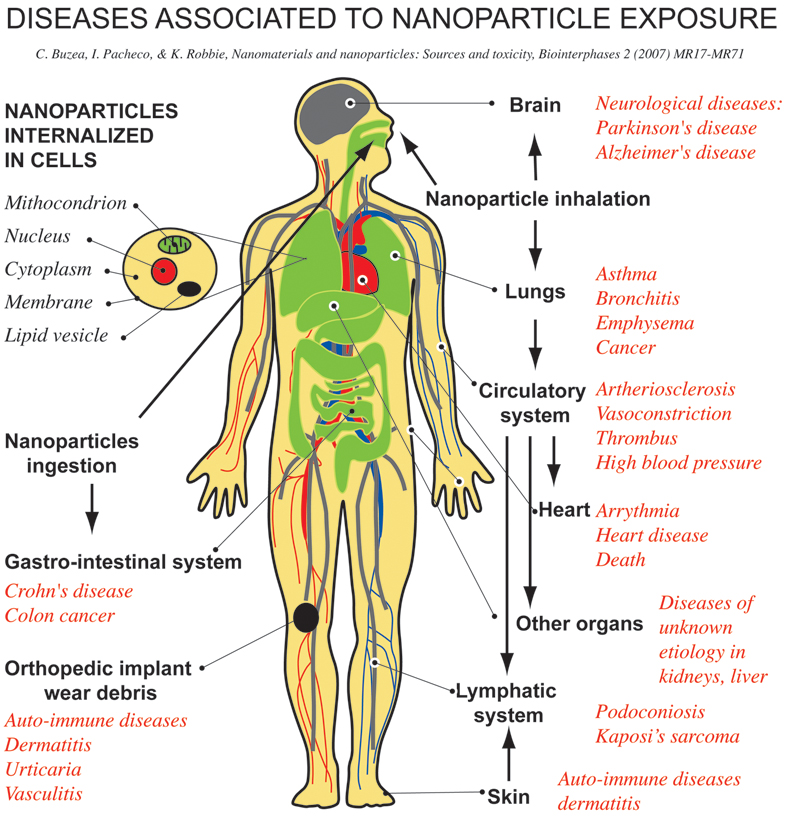
Pathways of exposure to nanoparticles and associated diseases as suggested by epidemiological, in vivo and in vitro studies.

The extremely small size of nanomaterials also means that they much more readily gain entry into the human body than larger sized particles. How these nanoparticles behave inside the body is still a major question that needs to be resolved. The behavior of nanoparticles is a function of their size, shape and surface reactivity with the surrounding tissue. In principle, a large number of particles could overload the body's phagocytes, cells that ingest and destroy foreign matter, thereby triggering stress reactions that lead to inflammation and weaken the body's defense against other pathogens. In addition to questions about what happens if non-degradable or slowly degradable nanoparticles accumulate in bodily organs, another concern is their potential interaction or interference with biological processes inside the body. Because of their large surface area, nanoparticles will, on exposure to tissue and fluids, immediately adsorb onto their surface some of the macromolecules they encounter. This may, for instance, affect the regulatory mechanisms of enzymes and other proteins.

Nanomaterials are able to cross biological membranes and access cells, tissues and organs that larger-sized particles normally cannot. Nanomaterials can gain access to the blood stream via inhalation or ingestion. Broken skin is an ineffective particle barrier, suggesting that acne, eczema, shaving wounds or severe sunburn may accelerate skin uptake of nanomaterials. Then, once in the blood stream, nanomaterials can be transported around the body and be taken up by organs and tissues, including the brain, heart, liver, kidneys, spleen, bone marrow and nervous system. Nanomaterials can be toxic to human tissue and cell cultures (resulting in increased oxidative stress, inflammatory cytokine production and cell death) depending on their composition and concentration.

== Mechanisms of toxicity ==
=== Oxidative stress ===
For some types of particles, the smaller they are, the greater their surface area to volume ratio and the higher their chemical reactivity and biological activity. The greater chemical reactivity of nanomaterials can result in increased production of reactive oxygen species (ROS), including free radicals. ROS production has been found in a diverse range of nanomaterials including carbon fullerenes, carbon nanotubes and nanoparticle metal oxides. ROS and free radical production is one of the primary mechanisms of nanoparticle toxicity; it may result in oxidative stress, inflammation, and consequent damage to proteins, membranes and DNA. For example, the application of nanoparticle metal oxide with magnetic fields that modulate ROS leading to enhanced tumor growth.

=== Cytotoxicity ===
A primary marker for the damaging effects of NPs has been cell viability as determined by state and exposed surface area of the cell membrane. Cells exposed to metallic NPs have, in the case of copper oxide, had up to 60% of their cells rendered unviable. When diluted, the positively charged metal ions often experience an electrostatic attraction to the cell membrane of nearby cells, covering the membrane and preventing it from permeating the necessary fuels and wastes. With less exposed membrane for transportation and communication, the cells are often rendered inactive.

NPs have been found to induce apoptosis in certain cells primarily due to the mitochondrial damage and oxidative stress brought on by the foreign NPs electrostatic reactions.

=== Genotoxicity ===
Metal and metal oxide NPs such as silver, zinc, copper oxide, uraninite, and cobalt oxide have also been found to cause DNA damage. The damage done to the DNA will often result in mutated cells and colonies as found with the HPRT gene test.

== Methods and standards ==
Characterization of a nanomaterial's physical and chemical properties is important for ensuring the reproducibility of toxicology studies, and is also vital for studying how the properties of nanomaterials determine their biological effects. The properties of a nanomaterial such as size distribution and agglomeration state can change as a material is prepared and used in toxicology studies, making it important to measure them at different points in the experiment.

With comparison to more conventional toxicology studies, in nanotoxicology, characterisation of the potential contaminants is challenging. The biological systems are themselves still not completely known at this scale. Visualisation methods such as electron microscopy (SEM and TEM) and atomic force microscopy (AFM) analysis allow visualisation of the nano world. Further nanotoxicology studies will require precise characterisation of the specificities of a given nano-element: size, chemical composition, detailed shape, level of aggregation, combination with other vectors, etc. Above all, these properties would have to be determined not only on the nanocomponent before its introduction in the living environment but also in the (mostly aqueous) biological environment.

There is a need for new methodologies to quickly assess the presence and reactivity of nanoparticles in commercial, environmental, and biological samples since current detection techniques require expensive and complex analytical instrumentation.

== Policy and regulatory aspects ==
Toxicology studies of nanomaterials are a key input into determining occupational exposure limits.

The Royal Society identifies the potential for nanoparticles to penetrate the skin, and recommends that the use of nanoparticles in cosmetics be conditional upon a favorable assessment by the relevant European Commission safety advisory committee.

The Woodrow Wilson Centre's Project on Emerging Technologies conclude that there is insufficient funding for human health and safety research, and as a result there is currently limited understanding of the human health and safety risks associated with nanotechnology. While the US National Nanotechnology Initiative reports that around four percent (about $40 million) is dedicated to risk related research and development, the Woodrow Wilson Centre estimate that only around $11 million is actually directed towards risk related research. They argued in 2007 that it would be necessary to increase funding to a minimum of $50 million in the following two years so as to fill the gaps in knowledge in these areas.

The potential for workplace exposure was highlighted by the 2004 Royal Society report which recommended a review of existing regulations to assess and control workplace exposure to nanoparticles and nanotubes. The report expressed particular concern for the inhalation of large quantities of nanoparticles by workers involved in the manufacturing process.

Stakeholders concerned by the lack of a regulatory framework to assess and control risks associated with the release of nanoparticles and nanotubes have drawn parallels with bovine spongiform encephalopathy (‘mad cow's disease'), thalidomide, genetically modified food, nuclear energy, reproductive technologies, biotechnology, and asbestosis. In light of such concerns, the Canadian-based ETC Group have called for a moratorium on nano-related research until comprehensive regulatory frameworks are developed that will ensure workplace safety.

More recent analyses indicate that, despite regional advances, nanomaterial oversight remains fragmented, with agencies recommending case-by-case assessments. Calls have been made for harmonised testing protocols and shared databases to strengthen global comparability of risk evaluations.

== See also ==
- International Center for Technology Assessment
- Toxicology
