= Stokes radius =

Parameter of solute diffusion

The Stokes radius or Stokes–Einstein radius of a solute is the radius of a hard sphere that diffuses at the same rate as that solute. Named after George Gabriel Stokes, it is closely related to solute mobility, factoring in not only size but also solvent effects. A smaller ion with stronger hydration, for example, may have a greater Stokes radius than a larger ion with weaker hydration. This is because the smaller ion drags a greater number of water molecules with it as it moves through the solution.

Stokes radius is sometimes used synonymously with effective hydrated radius in solution. Hydrodynamic radius, R_{H}, can refer to the Stokes radius of a polymer or other macromolecule.

== Spherical case ==
According to Stokes’ law, a perfect sphere traveling through a viscous liquid feels a drag force proportional to the frictional coefficient $f$:

$$F_\text{drag} = fs = (6 \pi \eta a)s$$

where $\eta$ is the liquid's viscosity, $s$ is the sphere's drift speed, and $a$ is its radius. Because ionic mobility $\mu$ is directly proportional to drift speed, it is inversely proportional to the frictional coefficient:

$$\mu = \frac{ze}{f}$$

where $ze$ represents ionic charge in integer multiples of electron charges.

In 1905, Albert Einstein found the diffusion coefficient $D$ of an ion to be proportional to its mobility constant:

$$D = \frac{\mu k_\text{B} T}{q} = \frac{k_\text{B} T}{f}$$

where $k_\text{B}$ is the Boltzmann constant and $q$ is electrical charge. This is known as the Einstein relation. Substituting in the frictional coefficient of a perfect sphere from Stokes’ law yields

$$D = \frac{k_\text{B} T}{6 \pi \eta a}$$

which can be rearranged to solve for $a$, the radius:

$$R_H = a = \frac{k_\text{B} T}{6 \pi \eta D}$$

In non-spherical systems, the frictional coefficient is determined by the size and shape of the species under consideration.

== Research applications ==
Stokes radii are often determined experimentally by gel-permeation or gel-filtration chromatography. They are useful in characterizing biological species due to the size-dependence of processes like enzyme-substrate interaction and membrane diffusion. The Stokes radii of sediment, soil, and aerosol particles are considered in ecological measurements and models. They likewise play a role in the study of polymer and other macromolecular systems.

== See also ==
- Born equation
- Capillary electrophoresis
- Dynamic light scattering
- Equivalent spherical diameter
- Einstein relation (kinetic theory)
- Ionic radius
- Ion transport number
- Molar conductivity
