= Shape =

Form of an object

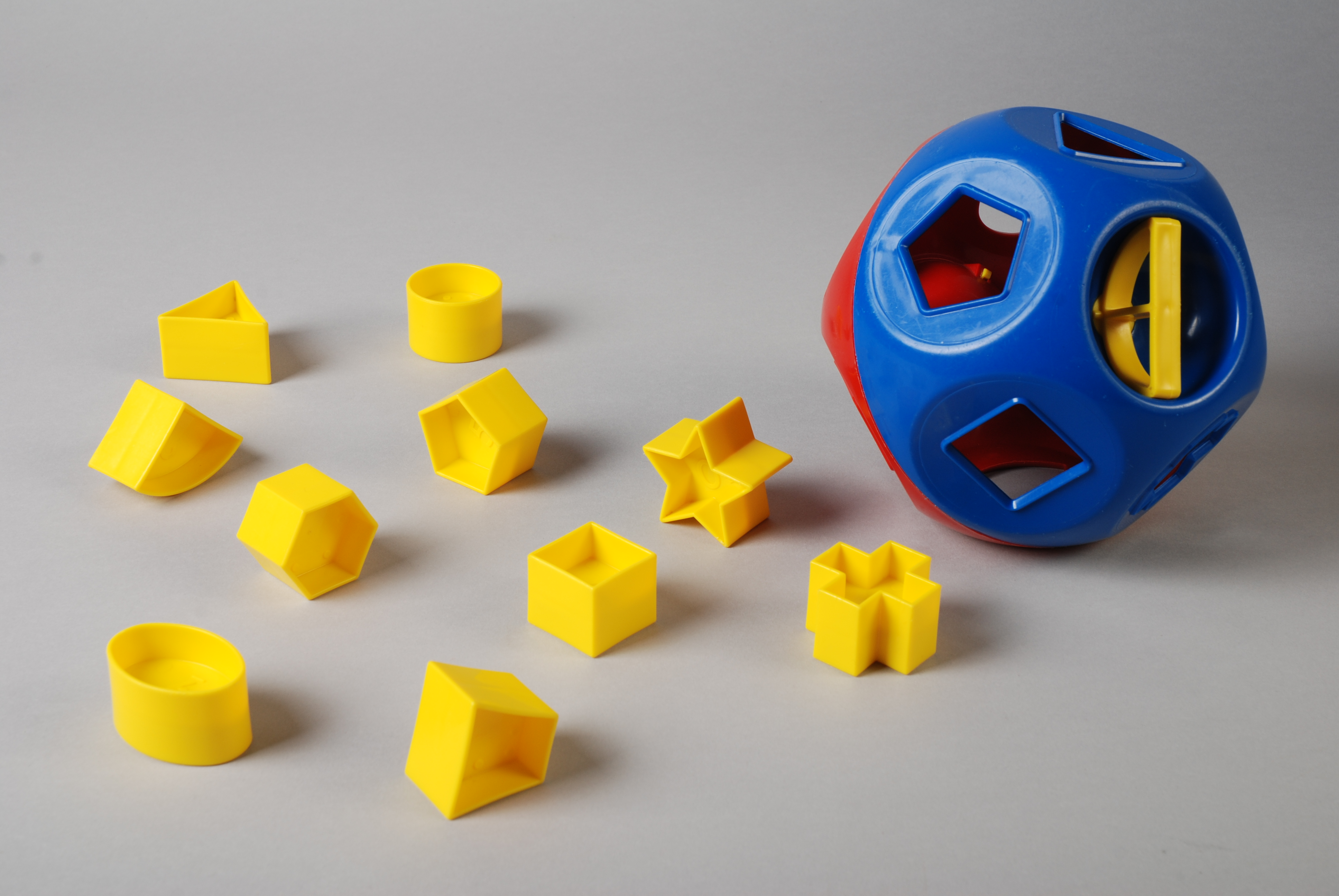
A children's toy called Shape-O, made by Tupperware, used for learning various shapes

A shape is a graphical representation of an object's form or its external boundary, outline, or external surface. It is distinct from other object properties, such as color, texture, or material type. In geometry, shape excludes information about the object's position, size, orientation and chirality. A figure is a representation including both shape and size (as in, e.g., figure of the Earth).

A plane shape or plane figure is constrained to lie on a plane, in contrast to solid 3D shapes. A two-dimensional shape or two-dimensional figure (also: 2D shape or 2D figure) may lie on a more general curved surface (a two-dimensional space).

== Classification of simple shapes ==
A variety of polygonal shapes

Some simple shapes can be put into broad categories. For instance, polygons are classified according to their number of edges as triangles, quadrilaterals, pentagons, etc. Each of these is divided into smaller categories; triangles can be equilateral, isosceles, obtuse, acute, scalene, etc. while quadrilaterals can be rectangles, rhombi, trapezoids, squares, etc.

Other common shapes are points, lines, planes, and conic sections such as ellipses, circles, and parabolas.

Among the most common three-dimensional shapes are polyhedra, which are shapes with flat faces; ellipsoids, which are egg-shaped or sphere-shaped objects; cylinders; and cones.

If an object falls into one of these categories exactly or even approximately, we can use it to describe the shape of the object. Thus, we say that the shape of a manhole cover is a disk, because it is approximately the same geometric object as an actual geometric disk.

== In geometry ==
A set of geometric shapes in two dimensions: parallelogram, triangle & circle

A set of geometric shapes in three dimensions: pyramid, sphere & cube

A geometric shape consists of the geometric information which remains when location, scale, orientation and reflection are removed from the description of a geometric object. That is, the result of moving a shape around, enlarging it, rotating it, or reflecting it in a mirror is the same shape as the original, and not a distinct shape.

Many two-dimensional geometric shapes can be defined by a set of points or vertices and lines connecting the points in a closed chain, as well as the resulting interior points. Such shapes are called polygons and include triangles, squares, and pentagons. Other shapes may be bounded by curves such as the circle or the ellipse.

Many three-dimensional geometric shapes can be defined by a set of vertices, lines connecting the vertices, and two-dimensional faces enclosed by those lines, as well as the resulting interior points. Such shapes are called polyhedrons and include cubes as well as pyramids such as tetrahedrons. Other three-dimensional shapes may be bounded by curved surfaces, such as the ellipsoid and the sphere.

A shape is said to be convex if all of the points on a line segment between any two of its points are also part of the shape.

=== Properties ===
There are multiple ways to compare the shapes of two objects:

- Congruence: Two objects are congruent if one can be transformed into the other by a sequence of rotations, translations, and/or reflections.
- Similarity: Two objects are similar if one can be transformed into the other by a uniform scaling, together with a sequence of rotations, translations, and/or reflections.
- Isotopy: Two objects are isotopic if one can be transformed into the other by a sequence of deformations that do not tear the object or put holes in it.

Figures shown in the same color have the same shape as each other and are said to be similar.

Sometimes, two similar or congruent objects may be regarded as having a different shape if a reflection is required to transform one into the other. For instance, the letters "b" and "d" are a reflection of each other, and hence they are congruent and similar, but in some contexts they are not regarded as having the same shape. Sometimes, only the outline or external boundary of the object is considered to determine its shape. For instance, a hollow sphere may be considered to have the same shape as a solid sphere. Procrustes analysis is used in many sciences to determine whether or not two objects have the same shape, or to measure the difference between two shapes. In advanced mathematics, quasi-isometry can be used as a criterion to state that two shapes are approximately the same.

Simple shapes can often be classified into basic geometric objects such as a line, a curve, a plane, a plane figure (e.g. square or circle), or a solid figure (e.g. cube or sphere). However, most shapes occurring in the physical world are complex. Some, such as plant structures and coastlines, may be so complicated as to defy traditional mathematical description – in which case they may be analyzed by differential geometry, or as fractals.

Some common shapes include: Circle, Square, Triangle, Rectangle, Oval, Star (polygon), Rhombus, Semicircle. Regular polygons starting at pentagon follow the naming convention of the Greek derived prefix with '-gon' suffix: Pentagon, Hexagon, Heptagon, Octagon, Nonagon, Decagon... See polygon

== Equivalence of shapes ==
In geometry, two subsets of a Euclidean space have the same shape if one can be transformed to the other by a combination of translations, rotations (together also called rigid transformations), and uniform scalings. In other words, the shape of a set of points is all the geometrical information that is invariant to translations, rotations, and size changes. Having the same shape is an equivalence relation, and accordingly a precise mathematical definition of the notion of shape can be given as being an equivalence class of subsets of a Euclidean space having the same shape.

Mathematician and statistician David George Kendall writes:

In this paper 'shape' is used in the vulgar sense, and means what one would normally expect it to mean. [...] We here define 'shape' informally as 'all the geometrical information that remains when location, scale and rotational effects are filtered out from an object.'

Shapes of physical objects are equal if the subsets of space these objects occupy satisfy the definition above. In particular, the shape does not depend on the size and placement in space of the object. For instance, a "d" and a "p" have the same shape, as they can be perfectly superimposed if the "d" is translated to the right by a given distance, rotated upside down and magnified by a given factor (see Procrustes superimposition for details). However, a mirror image could be called a different shape. For instance, a "b" and a "p" have a different shape, at least when they are constrained to move within a two-dimensional space like the page on which they are written. Even though they have the same size, there's no way to perfectly superimpose them by translating and rotating them along the page. Similarly, within a three-dimensional space, a right hand and a left hand have a different shape, even if they are the mirror images of each other. Shapes may change if the object is scaled non-uniformly. For example, a sphere becomes an ellipsoid when scaled differently in the vertical and horizontal directions. In other words, preserving axes of symmetry (if they exist) is important for preserving shapes. Also, shape is determined by only the outer boundary of an object.

=== Congruence and similarity ===
Objects that can be transformed into each other by rigid transformations and mirroring (but not scaling) are congruent. An object is therefore congruent to its mirror image (even if it is not symmetric), but not to a scaled version. Two congruent objects always have either the same shape or mirror image shapes, and have the same size.

Objects that have the same shape or mirror image shapes are called geometrically similar, whether or not they have the same size. Thus, objects that can be transformed into each other by rigid transformations, mirroring, and uniform scaling are similar. Similarity is preserved when one of the objects is uniformly scaled, while congruence is not. Thus, congruent objects are always geometrically similar, but similar objects may not be congruent, as they may have different size.

=== Homeomorphism ===
A more flexible definition of shape takes into consideration the fact that realistic shapes are often deformable, e.g. a person in different postures, a tree bending in the wind or a hand with different finger positions.

One way of modeling non-rigid movements is by homeomorphisms. Roughly speaking, a homeomorphism is a continuous stretching and bending of an object into a new shape. Thus, a square and a circle are homeomorphic to each other, but a sphere and a donut are not. An often-repeated mathematical joke is that topologists cannot tell their coffee cup from their donut, since a sufficiently pliable donut could be reshaped to the form of a coffee cup by creating a dimple and progressively enlarging it, while preserving the donut hole in a cup's handle.

A described shape has external lines that you can see and make up the shape. If you were putting your coordinates on a coordinate graph you could draw lines to show where you can see a shape, however not every time you put coordinates in a graph as such you can make a shape. This shape has a outline and boundary so you can see it and is not just regular dots on a regular paper.

=== Shape analysis ===
The above-mentioned mathematical definitions of rigid and non-rigid shape have arisen in the field of statistical shape analysis. In particular, Procrustes analysis is a technique used for comparing shapes of similar objects (e.g. bones of different animals), or measuring the deformation of a deformable object. Other methods are designed to work with non-rigid (bendable) objects, e.g. for posture independent shape retrieval (see for example Spectral shape analysis).

=== Similarity classes ===
All similar triangles have the same shape. These shapes can be classified using complex numbers u, v, w for the vertices, in a method advanced by J.A. Lester and Rafael Artzy. For example, an equilateral triangle can be expressed by the complex numbers 0, 1, (1 + i√3)/2 representing its vertices. Lester and Artzy call the ratio
$$S(u, v, w) = \frac{u - w}{u - v}$$
the shape of triangle (u, v, w). Then the shape of the equilateral triangle is
$$\frac{0 - \frac{1 + i \sqrt{3}}{2}}{0 - 1} = \frac{1 + i\sqrt{3}}{2} = \cos(60^\circ) + i\sin(60^\circ) = e^{i\pi/3}.$$
For any affine transformation of the complex plane, $z \mapsto a z + b,\quad a \ne 0,$ a triangle is transformed but does not change its shape. Hence shape is an invariant of affine geometry. The shape p = S(u,v,w) depends on the order of the arguments of function S, but permutations lead to related values. For instance,
$$1 - p = 1 - \frac{u-w}{u-v} = \frac{w-v}{u-v} = \frac{v-w}{v-u} = S(v,u,w).$$
Also
$$p^{-1} = S(u,w,v).$$
Combining these permutations gives $S(v,w,u) = (1 - p)^{-1}.$ Furthermore,
$$p(1-p)^{-1} = S(u,v,w)S(v,w,u) = \frac{u-w}{v-w} = S(w,v,u).$$
These relations are "conversion rules" for shape of a triangle.

The shape of a quadrilateral is associated with two complex numbers p, q. If the quadrilateral has vertices u, v, w, x, then p = S(u,v,w) and q = S(v,w,x). Artzy proves these propositions about quadrilateral shapes:

1. If $p = (1-q)^{-1},$ then the quadrilateral is a parallelogram.
2. If a parallelogram has | arg p | = | arg q |, then it is a rhombus.
3. When p = 1 + i and q = (1 + i)/2, then the quadrilateral is square.
4. If $p = r(1-q^{-1})$ and sgn r = sgn(Im p), then the quadrilateral is a trapezoid.

A polygon $(z_1, z_2,...z_n)$ has a shape defined by n − 2 complex numbers $S(z_j, z_{j+1}, z_{j+2}), \ j=1,...,n-2.$ The polygon bounds a convex set when all these shape components have imaginary components of the same sign.

== Human perception of shapes ==
Human vision relies on a wide range of shape representations. Some psychologists have theorized that humans mentally break down images into simple geometric shapes (e.g., cones and spheres) called geons. Meanwhile, others have suggested shapes are decomposed into features or dimensions that describe the way shapes tend to vary, like their segmentability, compactness and spikiness. When comparing shape similarity, however, at least 22 independent dimensions are needed to account for the way natural shapes vary.

Experimental work suggests that an object's contour, whether sharp-angled or curved, has a critical influence on people's attitude toward that object. Studies of printed designs on packaging report that consumers show "a preference for rounded shapes," which can shift overall evaluations of labeled products. Other studies similarly show that logo and packaging can shift judgments of attributes (for example, circular cues "softness," angular cues "hardness").

There is also clear evidence that shapes guide human attention.

== See also ==
- Area
- Glossary of shapes with metaphorical names
- Lists of shapes
- Shape factor
- Size
- Skew polygon
- Solid geometry
- Region (mathematics)
