= Martin diameter =

The Martin diameter is the length of the area bisector of an irregular object in a specified direction of measurement. It is used to measure particle size in microscopy.

== See also ==
- Feret diameter
