= Shape factor (image analysis and microscopy) =

Shape factors are dimensionless quantities used in image analysis and microscopy that numerically describe the shape of a particle, independent of its size. Shape factors are calculated from measured dimensions, such as diameter, chord lengths, area, perimeter, centroid, moments, etc. The dimensions of the particles are usually measured from two-dimensional cross-sections or projections, as in a microscope field, but shape factors also apply to three-dimensional objects. The particles could be the grains in a metallurgical or ceramic microstructure, or the microorganisms in a culture, for example. The dimensionless quantities often represent the degree of deviation from an ideal shape, such as a circle, sphere or equilateral polyhedron. Shape factors are often normalized, that is, the value ranges from zero to one. A shape factor equal to one usually represents an ideal case or maximum symmetry, such as a circle, sphere, square or cube.

== Aspect ratio ==
The most common shape factor is the aspect ratio, a function of the largest diameter and the smallest diameter orthogonal to it:

$$A_R = \frac{d_\min}{d_\max}$$

The normalized aspect ratio varies from approaching zero for a very elongated particle, such as a grain in a cold-worked metal, to near unity for an equiaxed grain. The reciprocal of the right side of the above equation is also used, such that the AR varies from one to approaching infinity.

== Circularity ==
Another very common shape factor is the circularity (or isoperimetric quotient), a function of the perimeter P and the area A:

$$f_\text{circ} = \frac {4 \pi A} {P^2}$$

The circularity of a circle is 1, and much less than one for a starfish footprint. The reciprocal of the circularity equation is also used, such that f_{circ} varies from one for a circle to infinity.

== Elongation shape factor ==
The less-common elongation shape factor is defined as the square root of the ratio of the two second moments i_{n} of the particle around its principal axes.

$$f_\text{elong} = \sqrt{\frac{i_2}{i_1}}$$

== Compactness shape factor ==
The compactness shape factor is a function of the polar second moment i_{n} of a particle and a circle of equal area A.

$$f_\text{comp} = \frac{A^2}{2 \pi \sqrt{{i_1}^2 + {i_2}^2}}$$

The f_{comp} of a circle is one, and much less than one for the cross-section of an I-beam.

== Waviness shape factor ==
The waviness shape factor of the perimeter is a function of the convex portion P_{cvx} of the perimeter to the total.

$$f_\text{wav} = \frac{P_\text{cvx}}{P}$$

Some properties of metals and ceramics, such as fracture toughness, have been linked to grain shapes.

== An application of shape factors ==
Greenland, the largest island in the world, has an area of 2,166,086 km^{2}; a coastline (perimeter) of 39,330 km; a north–south length of 2670 km; and an east–west length of 1290 km. The aspect ratio of Greenland is

$$A_R = \frac{1290}{2670} = 0.483$$

The circularity of Greenland is

$$f_\text{circ} = \frac {4 \pi (2166086)} {39330^2} = 0.0176.$$

The aspect ratio is agreeable with an eyeball-estimate on a globe. Such an estimate on a typical flat map, using the Mercator projection, would be less accurate due to the distorted scale at high latitudes. The circularity is deceptively low, due to the fjords that give Greenland a very jagged coastline (see the coastline paradox). A low value of circularity does not necessarily indicate a lack of symmetry, and shape factors are not limited to microscopic objects.
