= Instruments used in medical laboratories =

This is a list of instruments used in general in laboratories, including:

- Biochemistry
- Microbiology
- Pharmacology

== Instrument list ==
Instrument	Uses
Test tube	
Folin-Wu tube	
Glass slide mycole and cover slips	in microscopy, serology, etc. as the solid backing on which test samples are
Petri dish	used for preparation of culture media and the culture of organisms they are in
Glass beaker	reagent storage
Glass flask	gastric acid, or other fluid titration
Pasteur pipette	for aspiration and addition of reagents
Graduated pipettes	for aspiration and addition of reagents, often of minuscule amounts of the material; used mainly in colorimetry
Syringes	
Disposable gloves	prevention of transmission of diseases (as long as not cut or perforated) to or from the user
Tourniquet	This is used to cause an artificial venous stasis by applying pressure through this rubber tube. This leads to engorgement of the veins, allowing them to be seen more easily. Used for intravenous injections and cannulation.
Microscope	used for visualising minute structures, including microbes
Bunsen burner or spirit lamps or candles	source of fire / heat
Ultracentrifuge	used to separate particles dispersed in a liquid according to their molecular mass
Electrophoresis apparatus	used to detect and classify serum proteins or proteins from any other source; also used for DNA separation
Chromatography:	
• Gas chromatography or Gas liquid chromatography (GLC)	
• Planar chromatography	
• Paper chromatography	
• Thin layer chromatography	
• Affinity chromatography	
• Ion exchange chromatography	
• Size exclusion chromatography	
• Countercurrent chromatography	
• Countercurrent chromatography	
• Hematology analyzer	It is simply known as Cell Counter.
• Semiauto analyzer	
• Reflotron	
Setup for radioimmunoassay or RIA	Previously this was widely used to detect various things in bold fluids like proteins (natural, infective, those produced by the body in reaction to disease, or cancer related), tumor markers, hormones, viruses (hepatitis, or HIV), etc.
Setup for enzyme linked immunosorbant assay (ELISA)	It is presently widely used to detect various things in bold fluids like proteins (natural, infective, those produced by the body in reaction to disease, or cancer related), tumor markers, hormones, viruses (hepatitis, HIV), etc. It has replaced RIA.
Colorimeter	used in photochemical analysis and quantitative estimation of substances such as blood sugar, creatinine, and hemoglobin.
Burette	used to measure the amount of acid or alkali used in titration
General laboratory stands, racks, filter paper, reagents, etc.	
Induction coils	as a source of high voltage electricity
Cathode ray oscilloscope	'
Recording kymograph	historically, used in human or animal experiments to measure and record data
Long extension kymograph	historically, used in or human animal experiments to measure and record data
Surface plasmon resonance	Label-free detection of molecule binding. Used to determine kinetic constants of the interaction (k_{a}, k_{d}, K_{D}). Can also be used for thermodynamic analysis.

== Image gallery ==
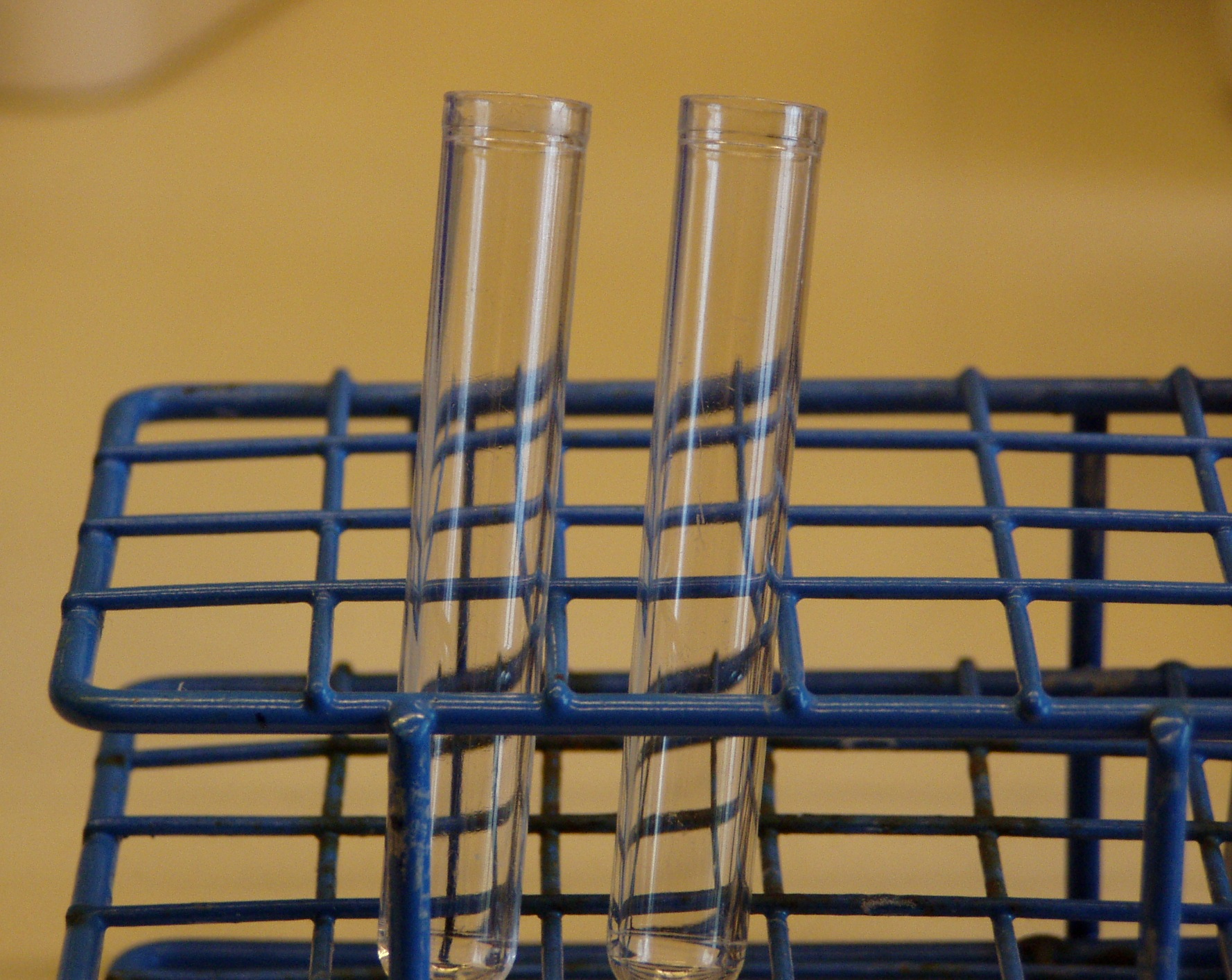
Test tubes in racks

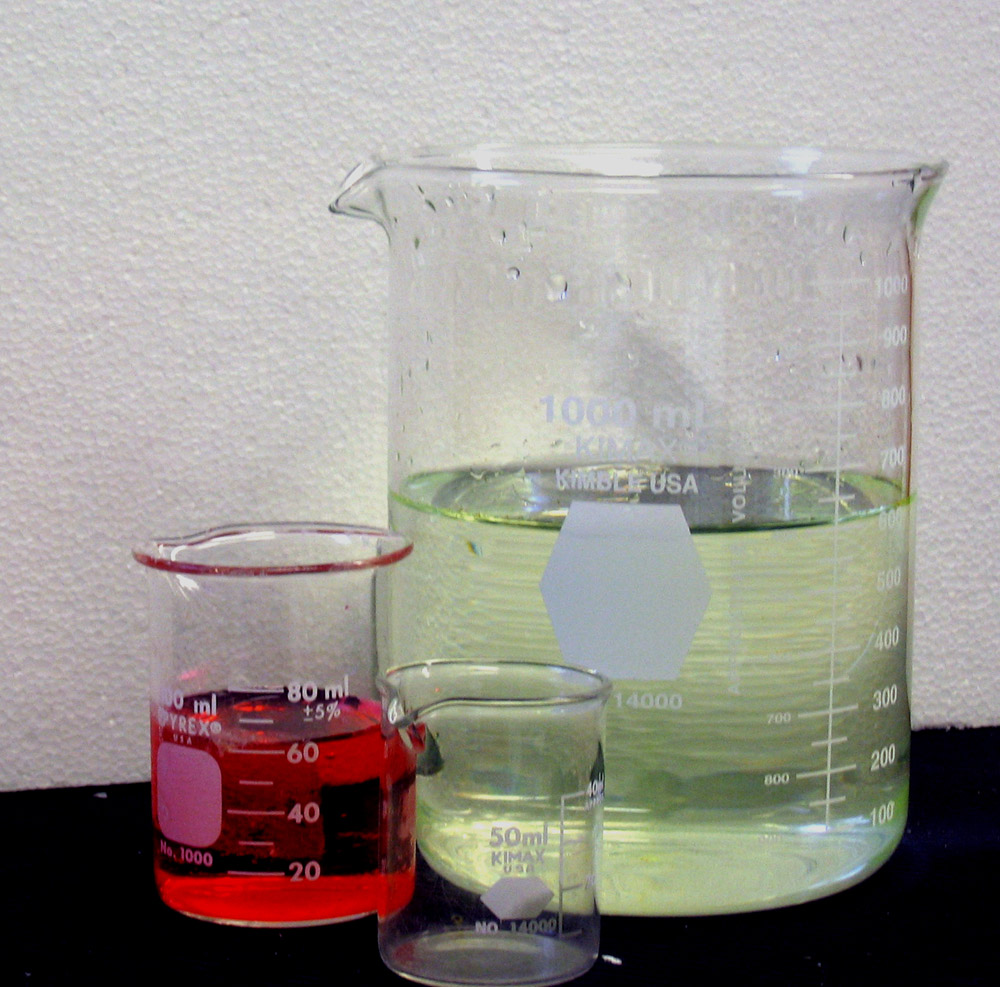
Beaker

Burette

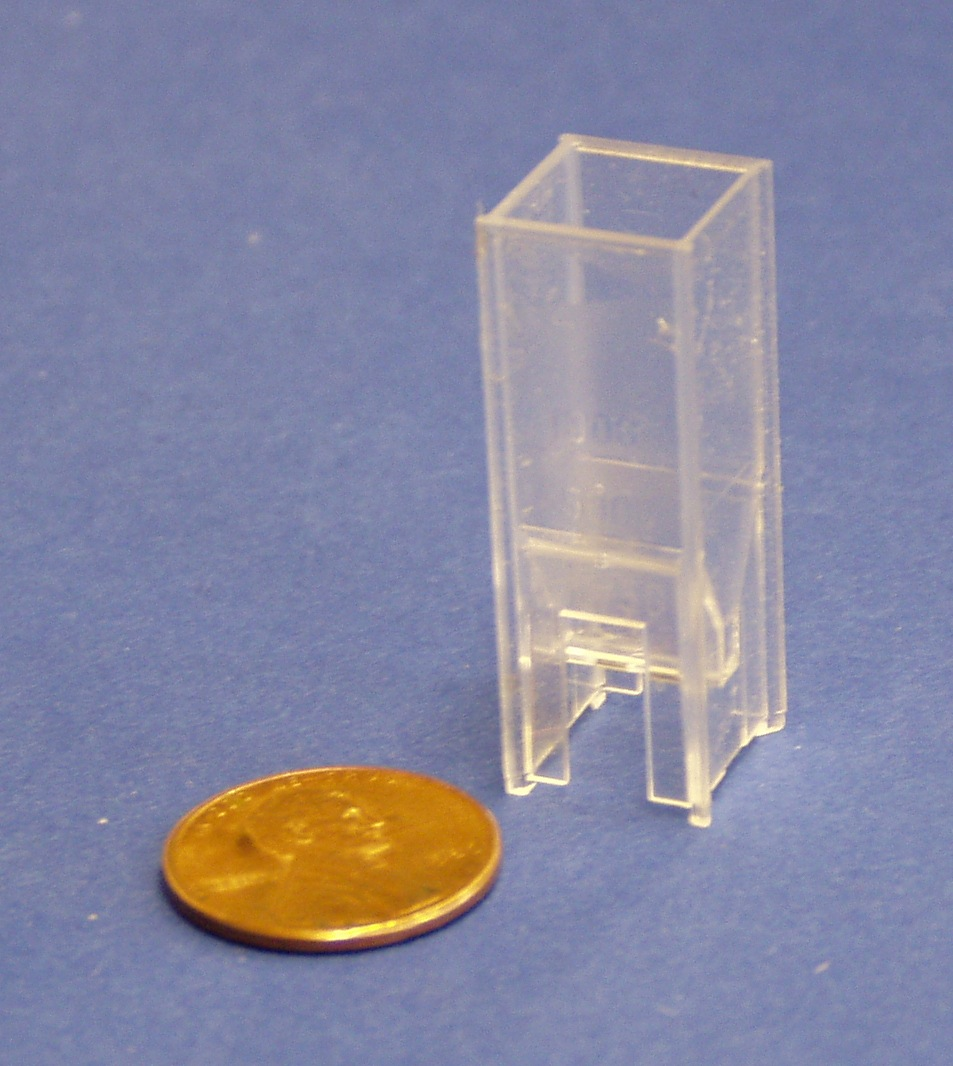
A cuvette of a colorimeter

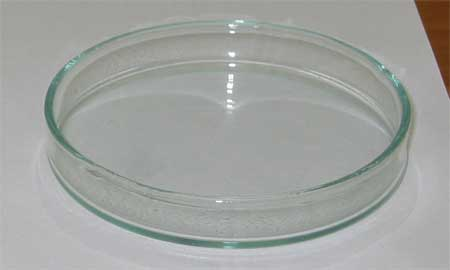
Petri dish

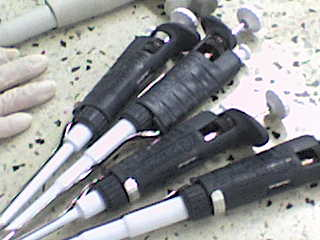
A set of micropipettes

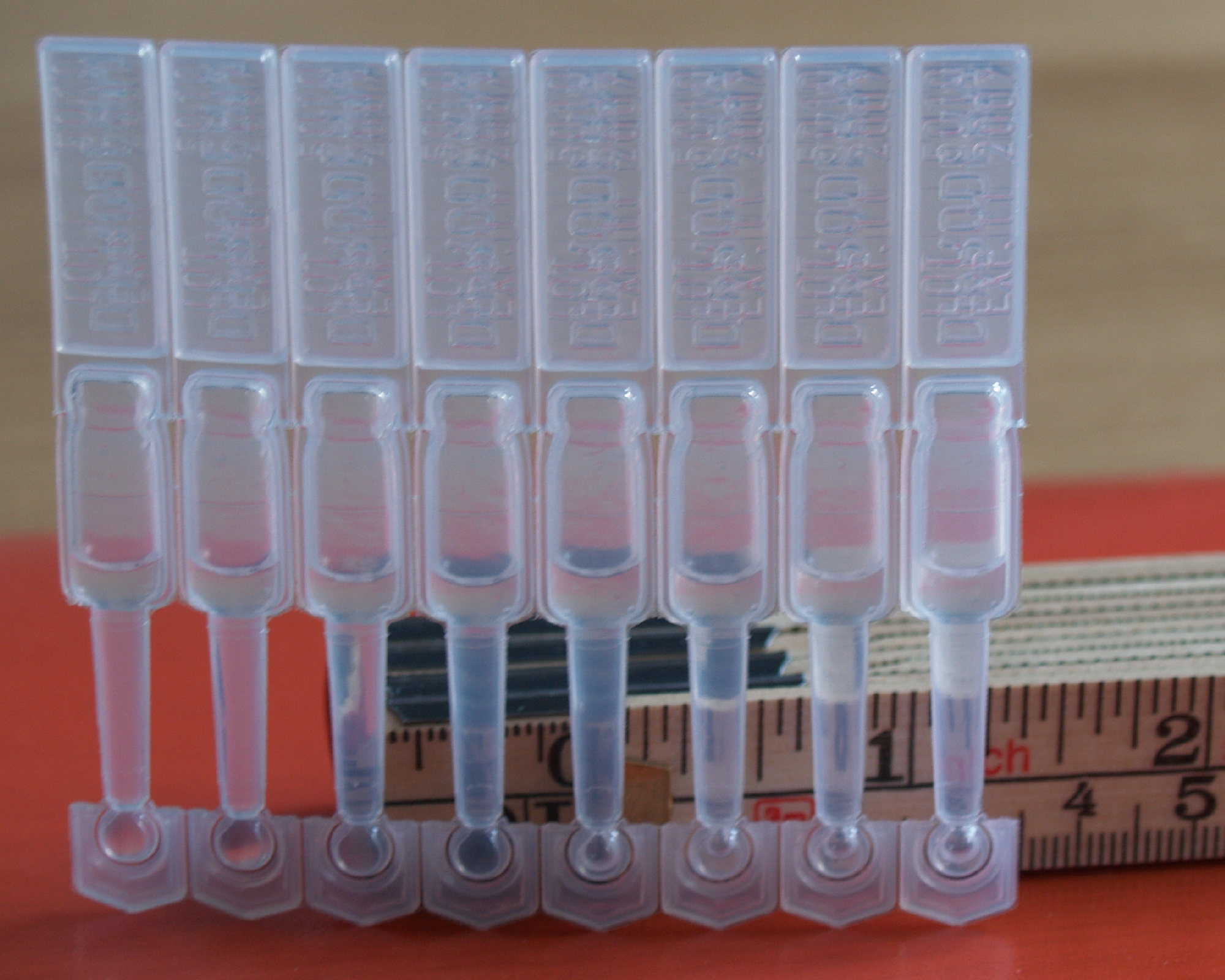
Dispensable pipettes

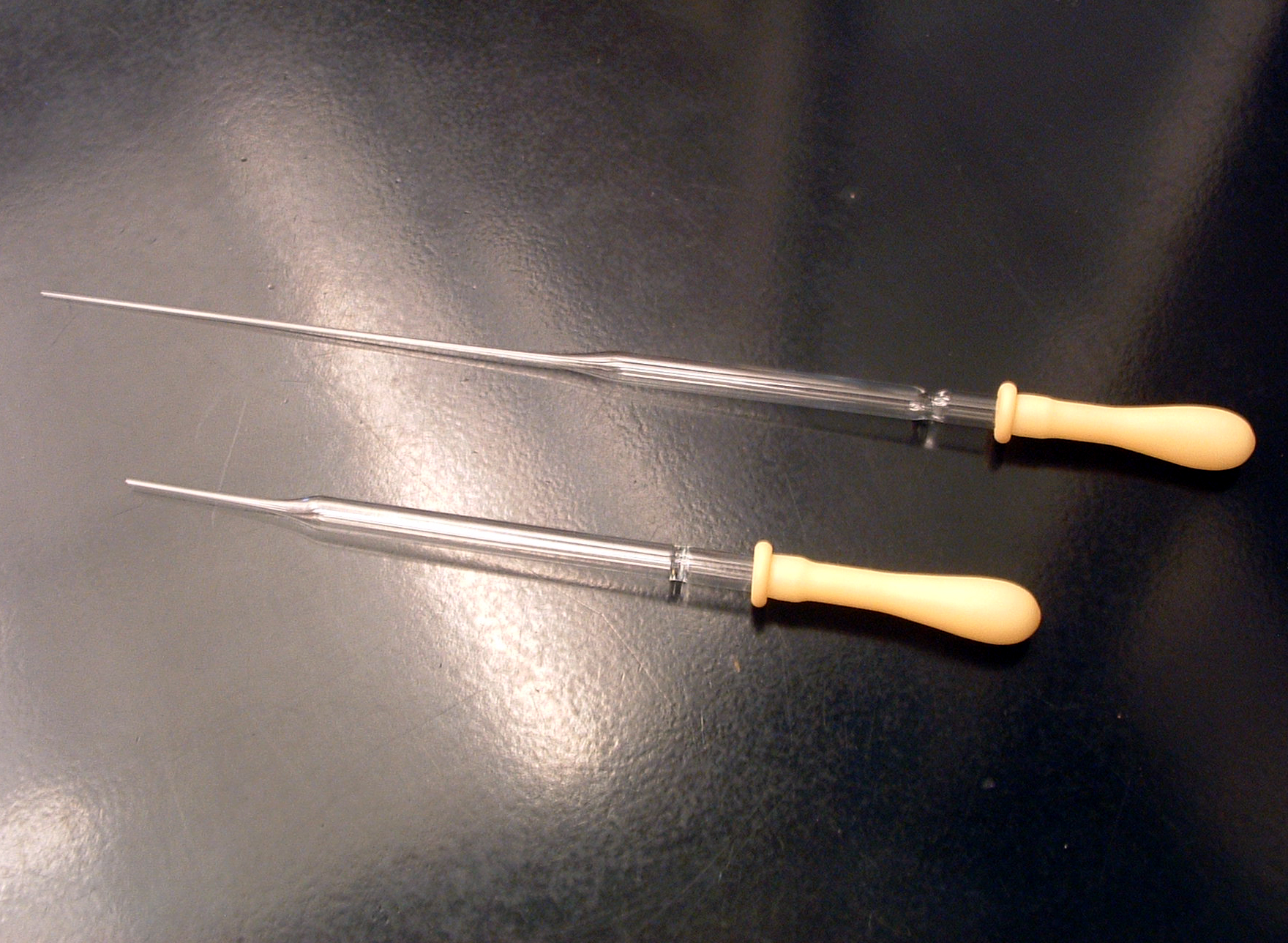
Glass Pasteur pipettes with teats

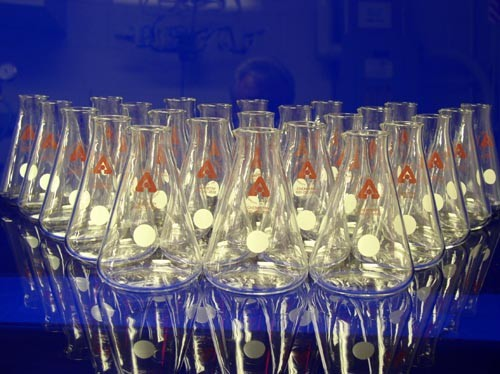
Flasks

Colorimeter (spectrophotometer)

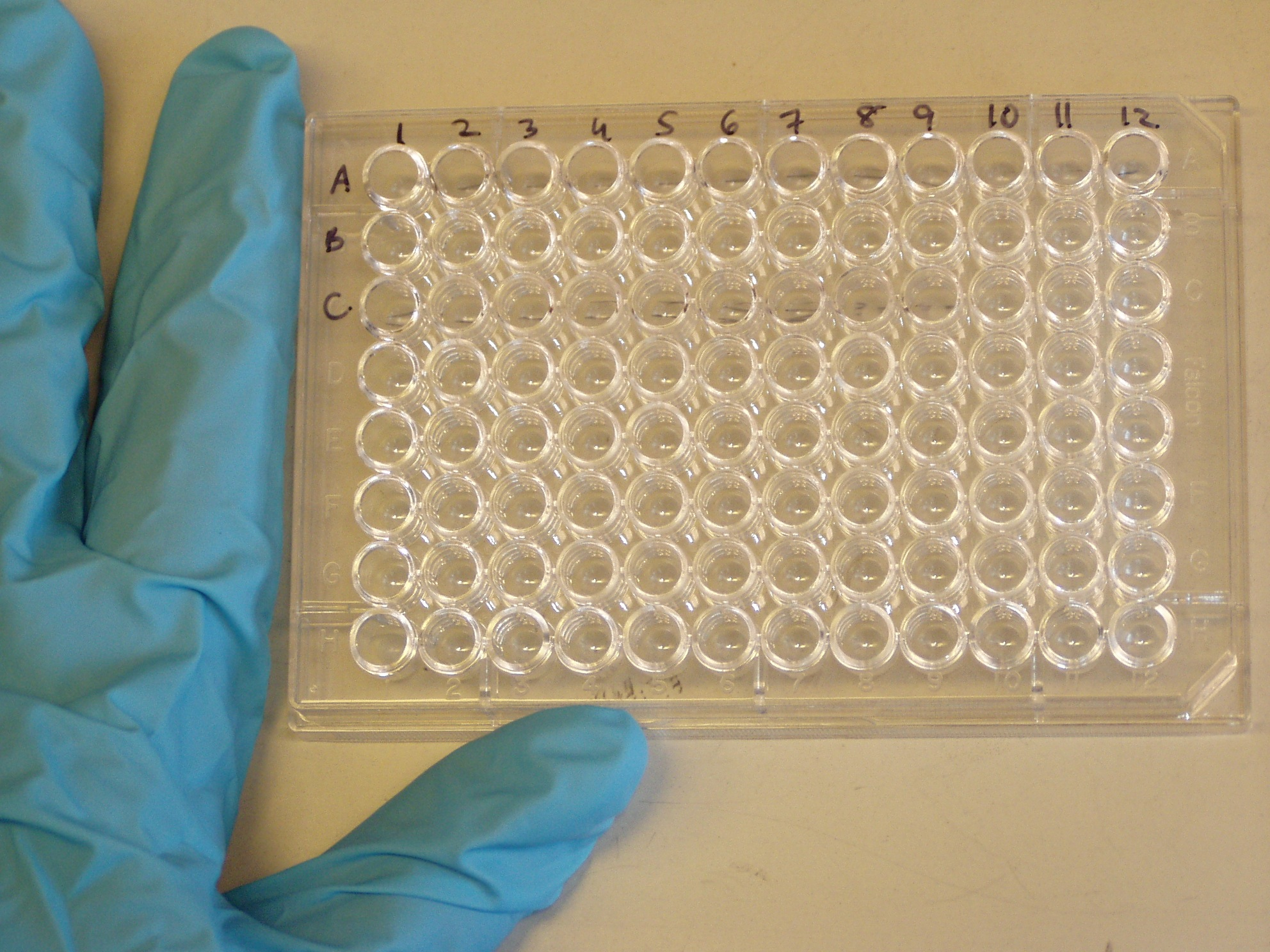
Microtiter plates

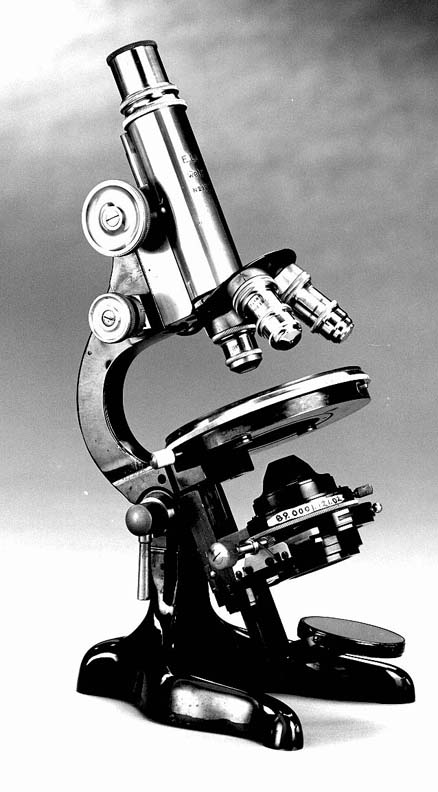
Antique light microscope

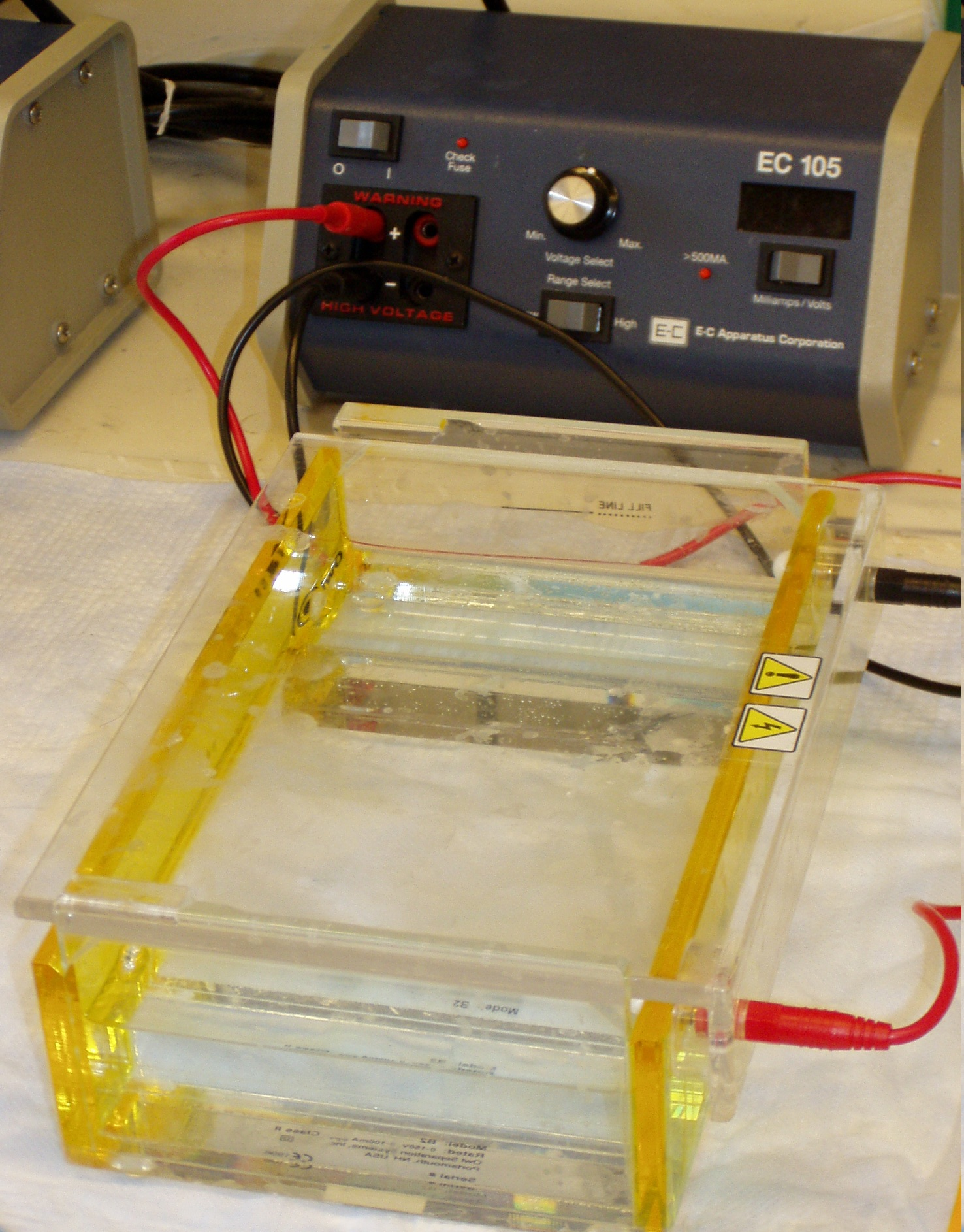
Gel electrophoresis apparatus

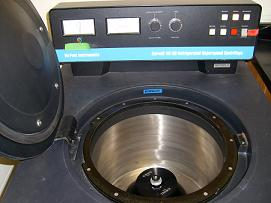
High-speed centrifuge

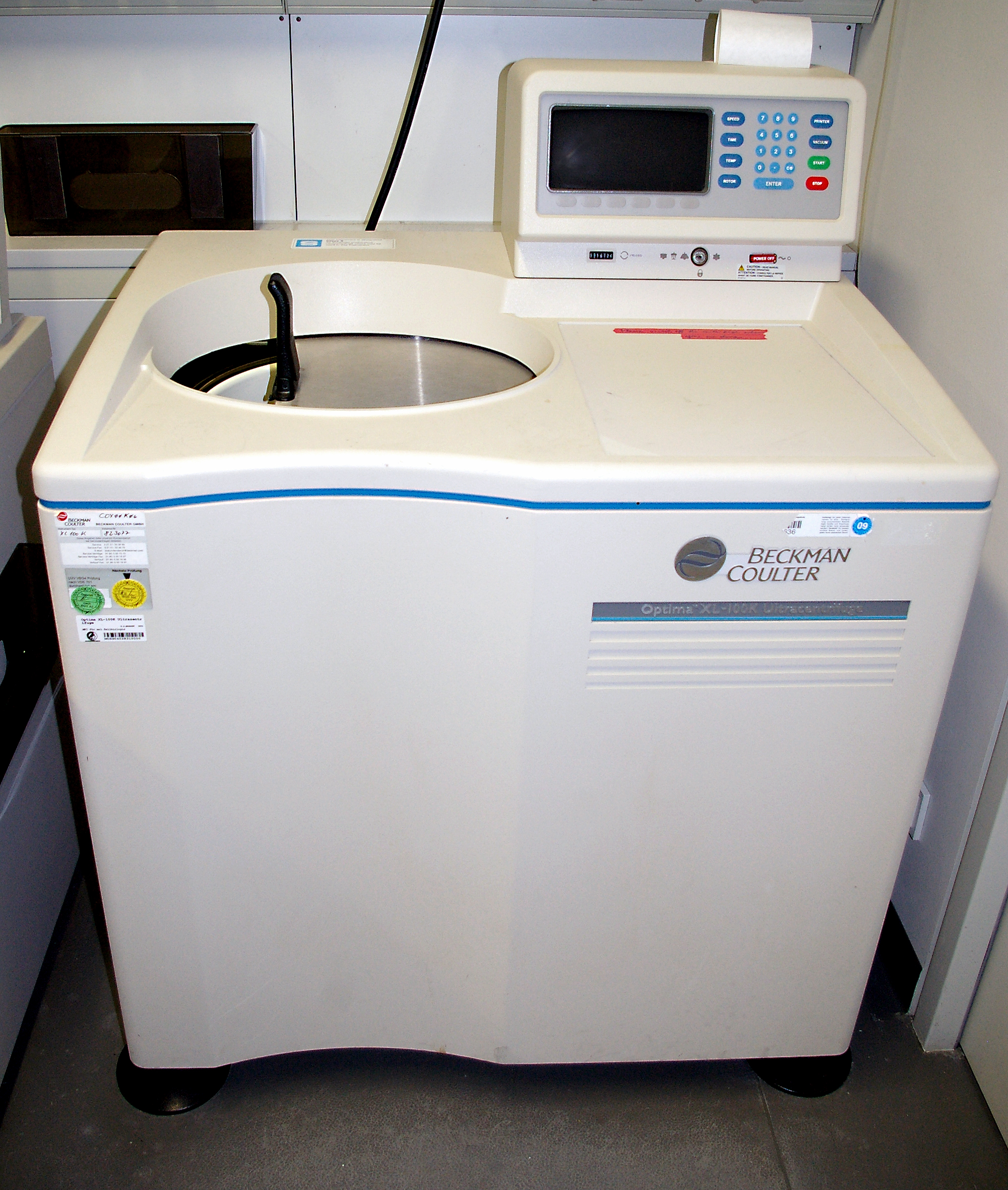
Ultracentrifuge

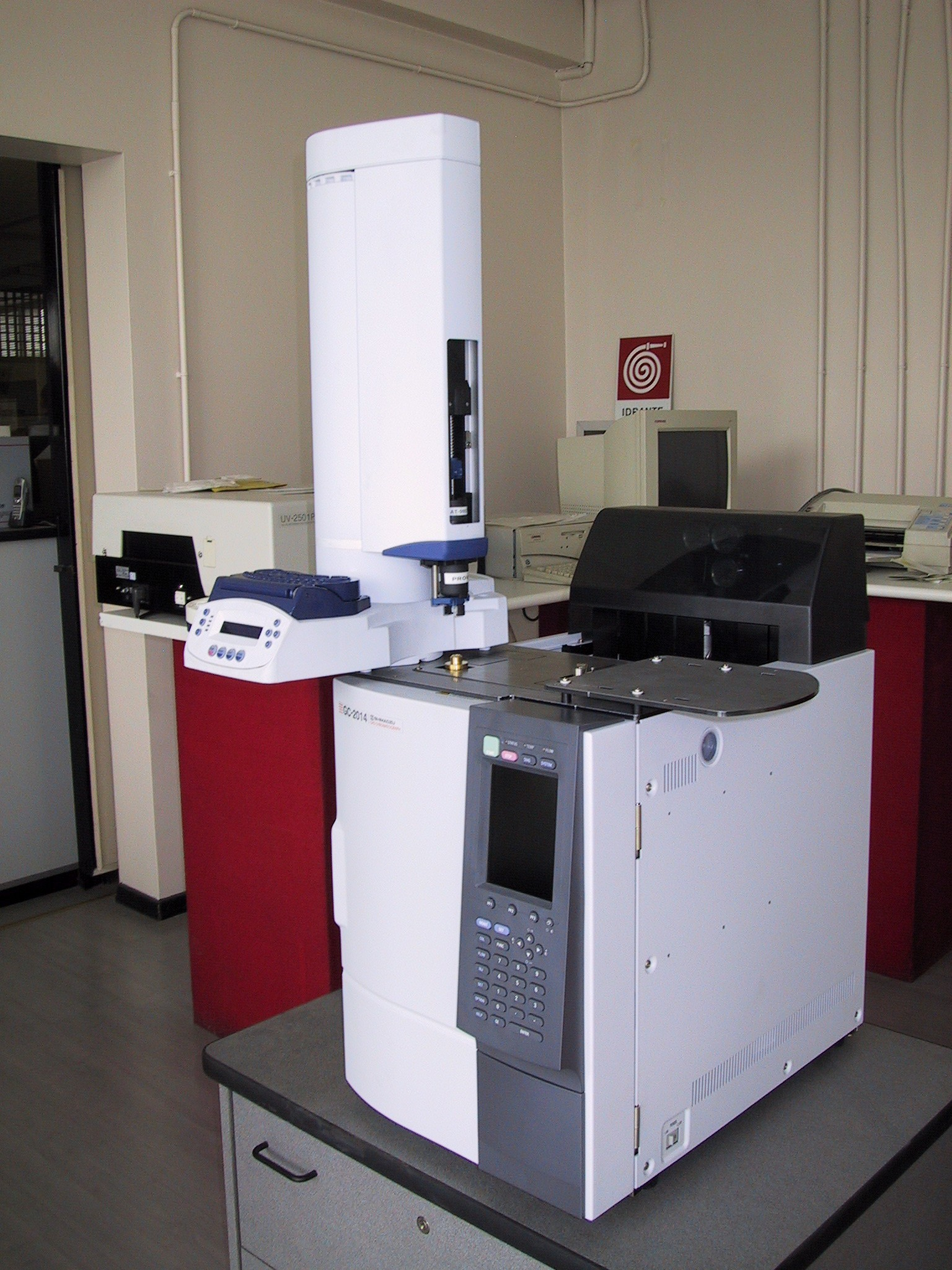
Gaschromatograph
