= Mohr pipette =

Type of pipette used to measure the volume of liquid dispensed

A Mohr pipette, also known as a graduated pipette, is a type of pipette used to measure the volume of the liquid dispensed, although not as accurately as a volumetric pipette. These use a series of marked lines (as on a graduated cylinder) to indicate the different volumes. They come in a variety of sizes, and are used much like a burette, in that the volume is found by calculating the difference of the liquid level before and after.

The last graduation mark is some distance from the tip, to avoid errors in measuring the narrower volume of the nozzle. It was invented by Karl Friedrich Mohr, the father of volumetric analysis.
