= Graduated pipette =

Pipette with its volume, in increments, marked along the tube

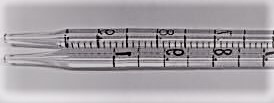
The difference between the calibration mark of Serological pipette (top) and Mohr (bottom)

A graduated pipette is a pipette with its volume, in increments, marked along the tube. It is used to accurately measure and transfer a volume of liquid from one container to another. It is made from plastic or glass tubes and has a tapered tip. Along the body of the tube are graduation markings indicating volume from the tip to that point. A small pipette allows for more precise measurement of fluids; a larger pipette can be used to measure volumes when the accuracy of the measurement is less critical. Accordingly, pipettes vary in volume, with most measuring between 0 and 25.0 millilitres (0.00 and 0.88 imp fl oz; 0.00 and 0.85 US fl oz).

== Types ==
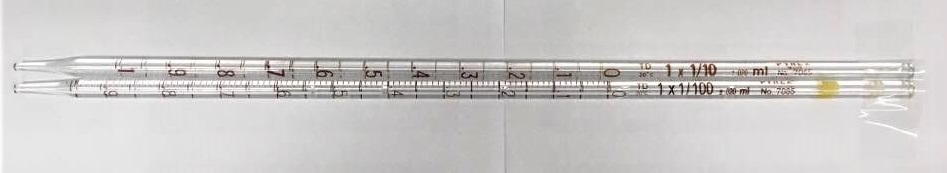
Differentiating the Mohr (top) and Serological pipette (bottom) by its graduation mark

=== Mohr and Serological pipettes ===
There are two types of pipettes that differ based on where the markings are located in reference to the pipette tip. These are Mohr pipettes and Serological pipettes, and they differ only by the position of the first graduation mark, nearest the tip of the pipette. A Mohr pipette is designed for use as a drain-out pipette. It has a straight tube and graduation marks indicating 0.10 millilitres (0.0035 imp fl oz; 0.0034 US fl oz) changes volume. This type of pipette does not have its first (lowest) graduation mark until well past the base of the tip. An error can occur because of improper use by the person using the pipette or if there is a break or crack in the pipette.

A Serological pipette is designed for use as a blow-out pipette. A Serological pipette also has graduation marks, which start nearer the end of the tip. The pipette can be blown out by gravitational force or air pressure. Rubber bulbs attached to the end opposite the tip are commonly used to "blow out" any remaining solution. Having solution remain in the pipette can affect an experiment by allowing a discrepancy between what is measured and what is transferred. The designation of whether the pipette is "to deliver" (TD) or "to contain" (TC) is marked on most serological pipettes.

=== Types 1, 2, and 3 ===
Graduated pipettes are classified into three types: Type 1, Type 2, and Type 3. Type 1 and Type 3 pipettes have the nominal value at the bottom (Zero at the top). For Type 1, the solution is delivered partially for all volumes. For type 3, the solution is delivered totally only at the nominal value. Type 2 pipettes have the nominal value at the top (Zero at the bottom) and the solution is delivered totally for any volume.

== History ==
A pipette is worked by creating a partial vacuum above the liquid-holding chamber, to draw up liquid, and by releasing the partial vacuum to deliver liquid.

Historically, the accuracy of a graduated pipette was not as good as that of a volumetric pipette (accuracy of 3 significant figures); however, with improved manufacturing methods, the accuracy listed by the manufacturer can equal that of a volumetric pipettes. Graduated pipettes are considered to be more precise than the Pasteur pipette. They have tolerances that range from ±0.6% to ±0.4% of the nominal volume when measured at 20 °C (68 °F).

Graduated pipettes are manufactured according to ISO specifications for accuracy and the arrangement of the graduations. Grade A and AS pipettes have the highest accuracy, S standing for "swift delivery". These allowed error ranges are identical to those of the DIN EN ISO standards. Grade B pipettes generally have twice the allowed error as grade A and AS pipettes.

These pipettes commonly come in 5, 10, 25, and 50 mL volumes. A variety of propipetters have been developed, both entirely manual and electrically assisted. Originally pipettes were made of soda-lime glass, but currently many are made of borosilicate glass; disposable graduated pipettes are often made of polystyrene.

== Specific standard for glass pipette tube ==
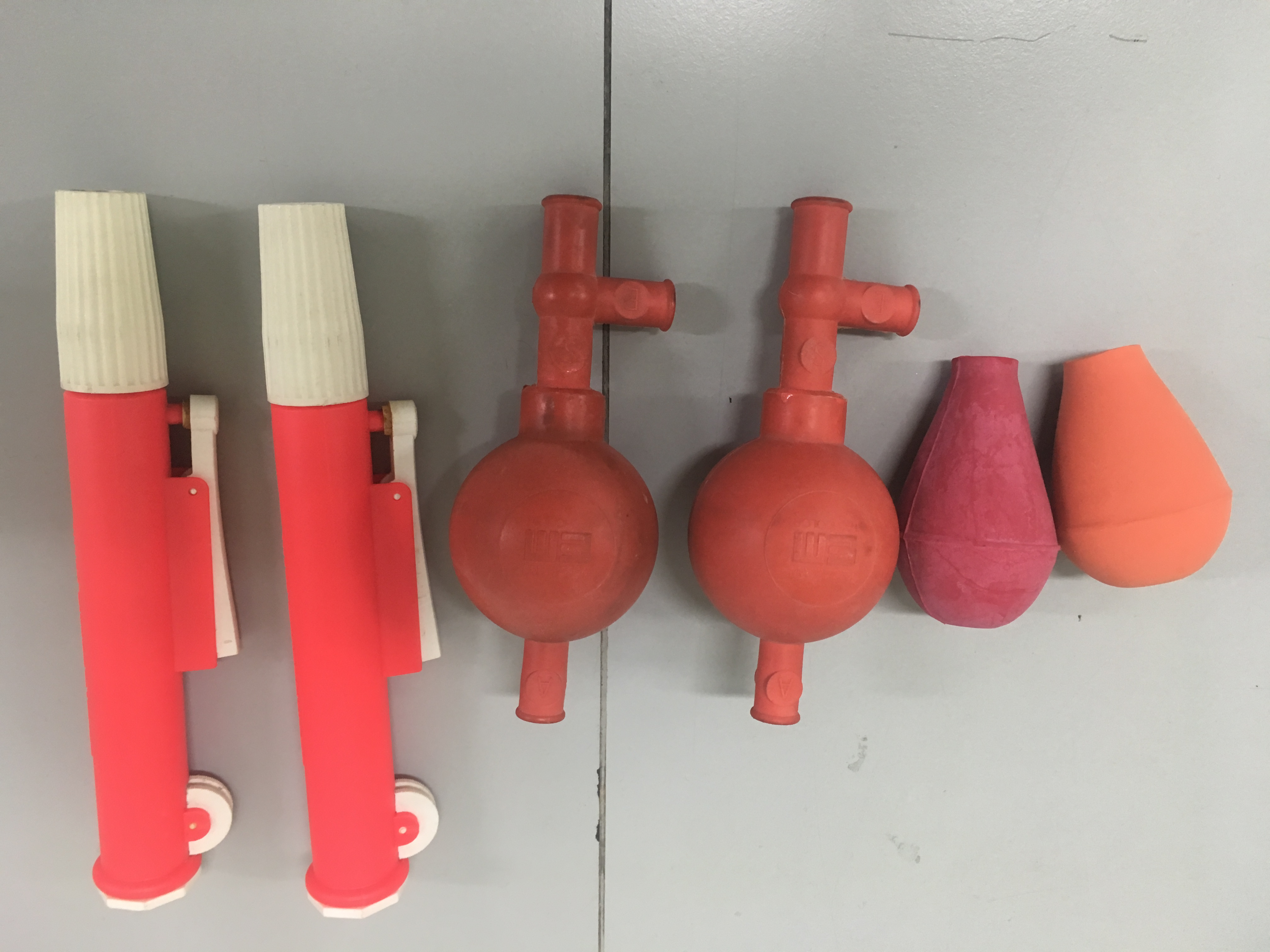
Different types of bulb (controller pipettes, silicone bulbs, normal bulbs) for drawing up solution into a graduated pipette

The standard classification of graduated pipettes is according to shape, delivery tips, graduation lines, periods of infill and discharge, and calibration.

Standard classification The most accurate glass graduated pipettes are classified according to genre, class, and dimension. The two genres, Genre 1 and Genre 2, denote, respectively, pipettes with "standard taper tip" and "long taper tip".

The two classes are Class A and Class B. Class A pipettes are manufactured to precise tolerances, or "error limits". Class B are allowed twice the error limits of Class A. The class specification or serial number of Class B are not marked.

Standard design The Genre 1 and Genre 2 the tapered delivery tips are different: for Genre 1, the tip is between 15 and 30 mm long, for a 5 ml capacity pipette, and between 20 and 40 mm, for 10 to 50 ml capacities; for Genre 2, the tip is longer, between 50 and 65 mm in length. The opening at the tip end is perpendicular to the tube axis, and an unexpectedly constricted opening is not acceptable for Genre 2 pipettes. Beveling and fire polishing of the external margin of the tip opening are essential.

The time allowed for filling and discharge, from the first to last marking, are specified. Such times are measured with a stopwatch and using distilled water at 20 °C.

The capacity scale is usually required to have no less than 90 mm worth of markings, the exception being that 0.5 ml pipettes have not less than 80 mm. The standard for all pipettes is that markings be indelible and comprehensible, etching markings and using permanent or enamel ink. Each graduation marking is required to not be off by more than 0.40 mm from true, and to be perpendicular to the tube axis.

== Accuracy classification ==
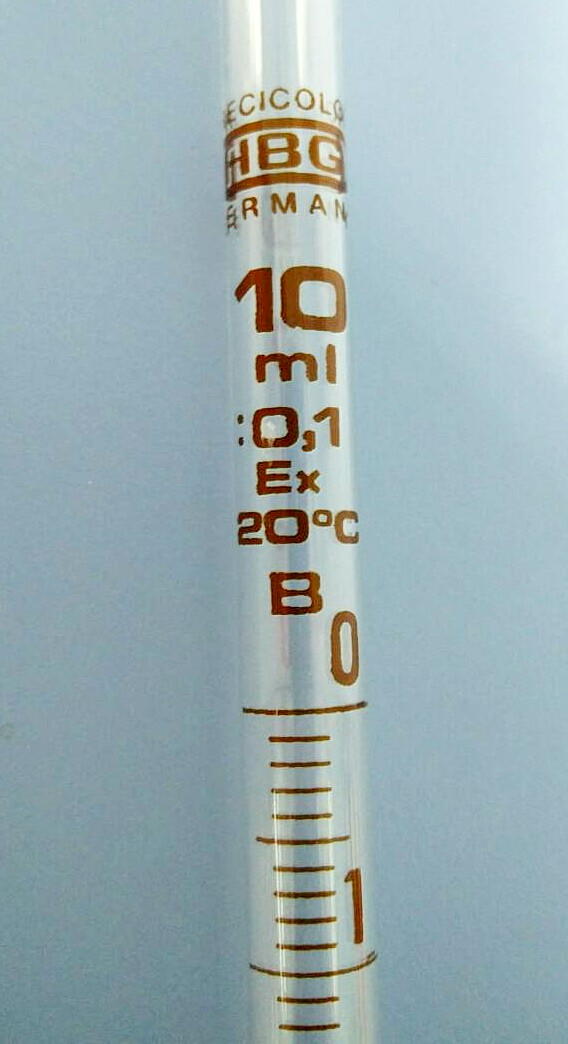
A Class B pipette, which is allowed twice the error tolerance as Class A and AS pipettes

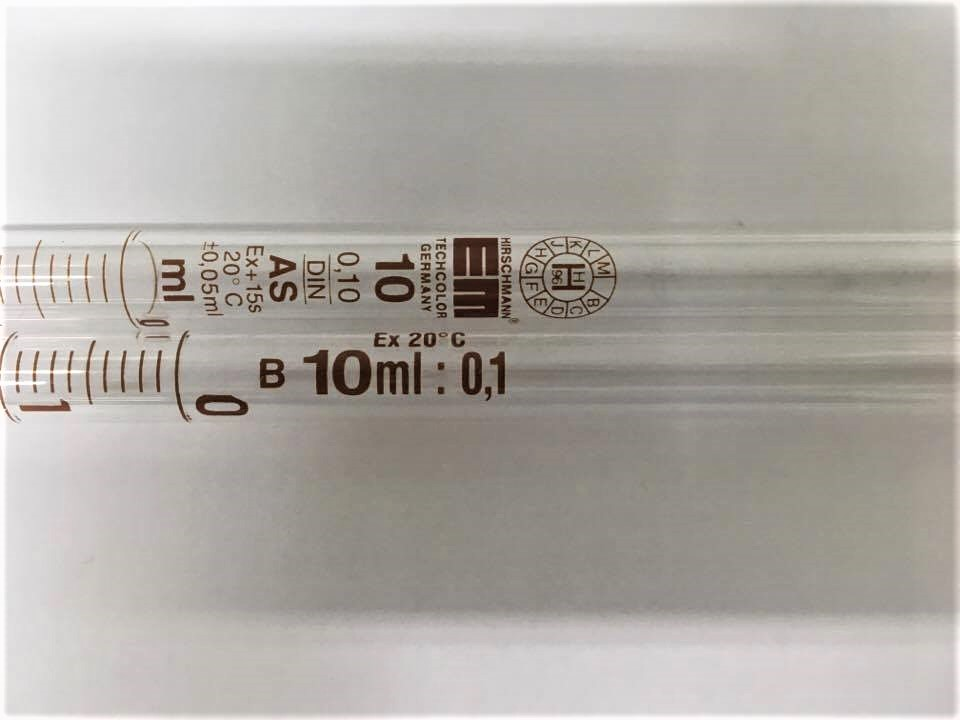
Two classes of the accuracy of classification. Class AS and Class B

Class A: The error limits of this class of glass volumetric equipment is specified by DIN EN ISO 9712, which applies both to Class A itself and to other classes that have a similar designation, such as Class AS.

Class AS: Specifies a "swift" delivery pipette, facilitated by the pipette having an expanded tip. The class marking is found near the volume specification.

Class B: The different between Class A/AS and Class B is that the error limits for Class B are twice that allowed classes A and AS, Class B pipettes can be made of plastic, and the delivery system (TD, Ex) waiting time isn't specified.

== Delivery and waiting times ==
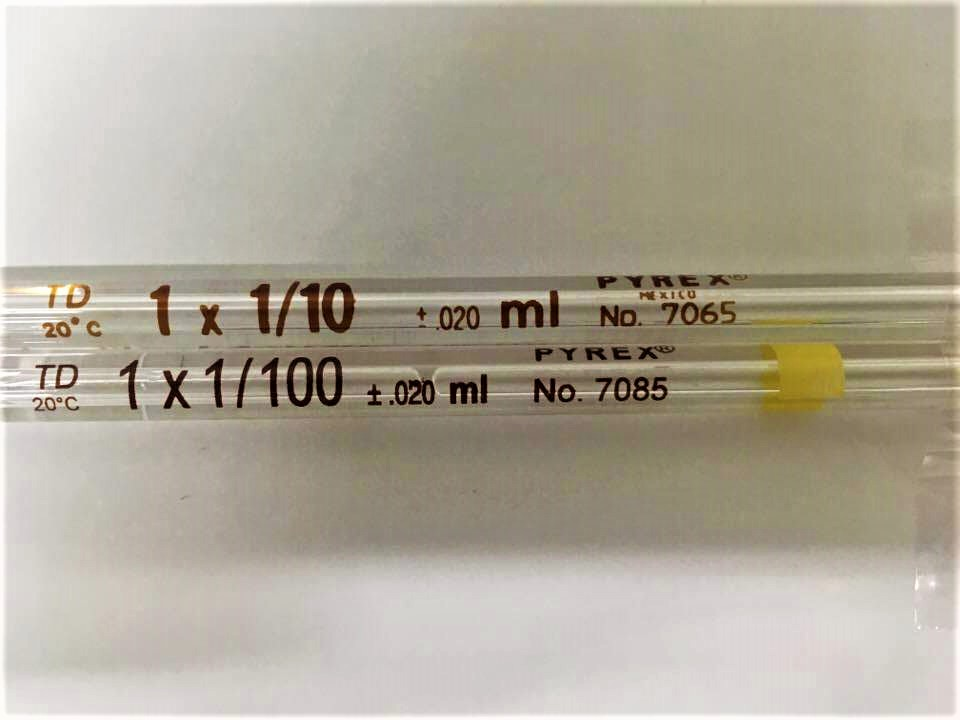
Delivery and waiting times represent as with the abbreviation "TD"

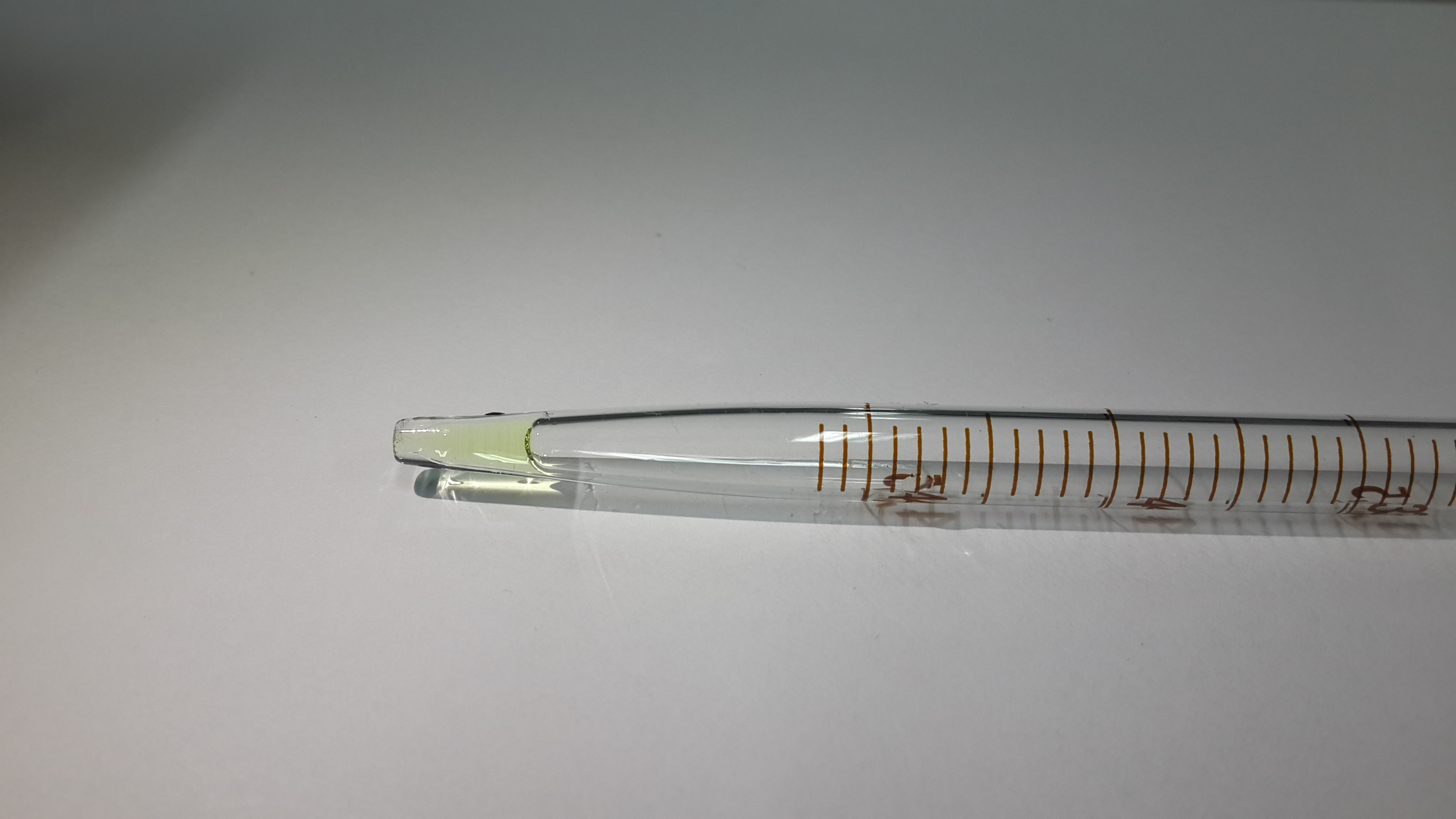
A few drops that remain due to adhesion are the difference in volume between the amount contained and the amount delivered. Pipettes can be calibrated to account for this expected volume or else to have this liquid blown out and transferred as well.

The delivery and waiting times represent the efficiency of the fluid being delivered as TD and EX. The marking of TD ("to deliver"), or EX, means that the specified volume is the amount of solution that will drain out of the pipette, which might be less than the total amount that is present due to remnant fluid that adheres to the wall of the equipment. The delivery time is described as the duration of time that the meniscus reaches the end of the tip starting from the topmost volume, which is specified as 5 seconds for Class AS bulb and graduated-pipette volumetric equipment. TD/EX pipettes are the most common type.

Another type is identified as TC ("to contain"), or IN, which means that the specified volume is the actual amount of solution present in the pipette, and therefore it is essential to blow it all out to get that amount into the secondary container.

Less commonly, some TD pipettes are made "to contain" as per manufacturer and made to be blown out. A set of two rings printed on the upper end of the pipette indicate that it is a "blow out" type and should be blown using a rubber bulb. Do not blow the solution out if the pipette has no rings on the upper end.

== Standard techniques ==
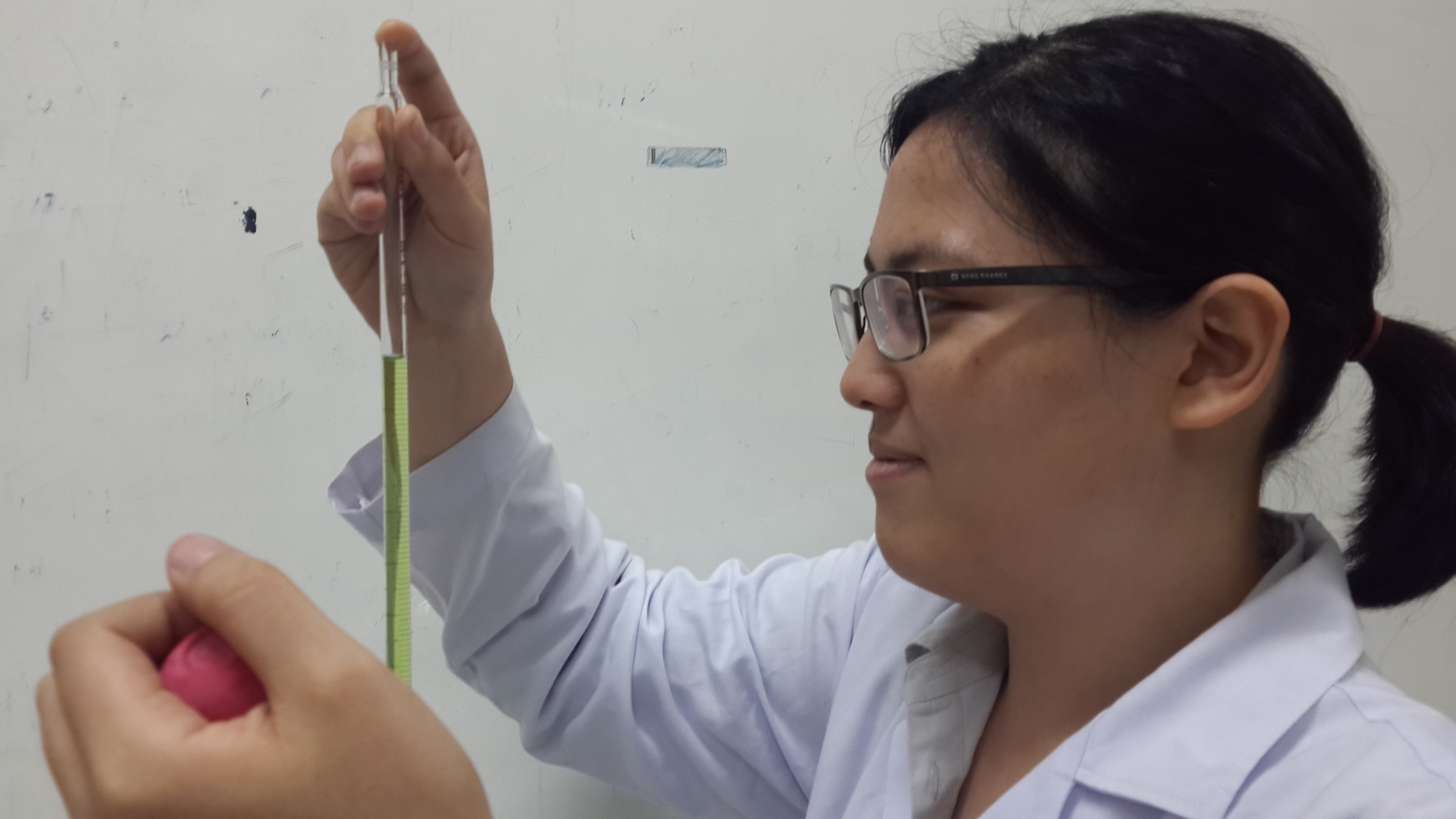
The volume is read by looking directly at the level of the meniscus, with the volume controlled by an index finder closing the top of the pipette tube

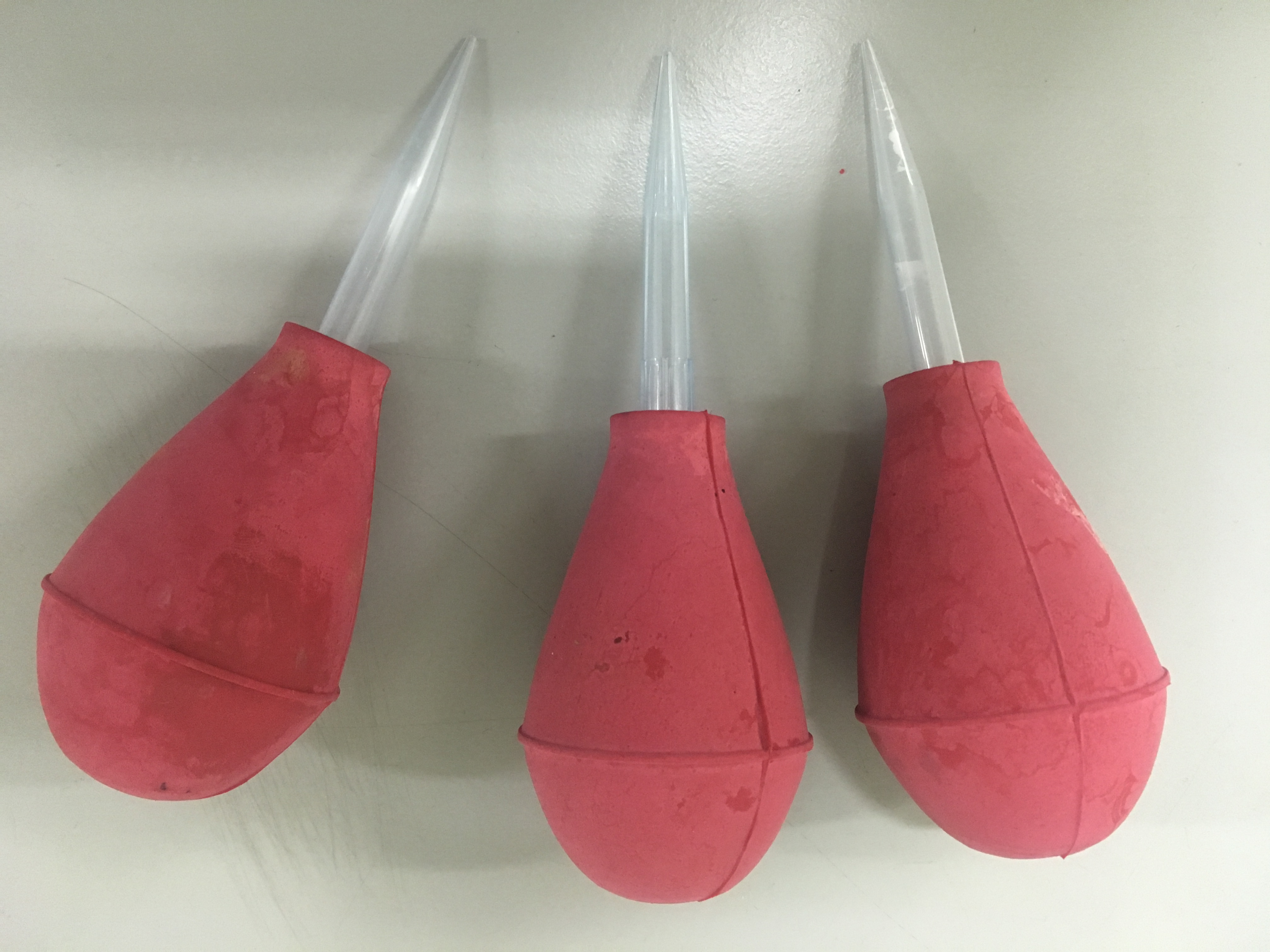
Bulb

The recommendation is for using a pipette whose size is nearest to the volume being worked with. Rinsing the pipette before use is required to prevent error. The standard technique for handling a graduated pipette is to hold the pipette tip dipped in the solution without touching the bottom of the beaker. Then use a propipetter, a pipette bulb, or rubber bulb, to draw the liquid into the pipette. The effective way to control the volume of the solution is to use one's forefinger. After getting the desired volume, the solution can be released into another vessel by lifting the finger. During pipetting, the pipette must not be held other than upright.

The solution will form a meniscus, whose position is read according to the scale printed on the pipette. For high viscosity liquids, the volume is measured by looking at the upper meniscus. For low viscosity liquids, the volume is measured by looking at the lower meniscus.

== Additional images ==
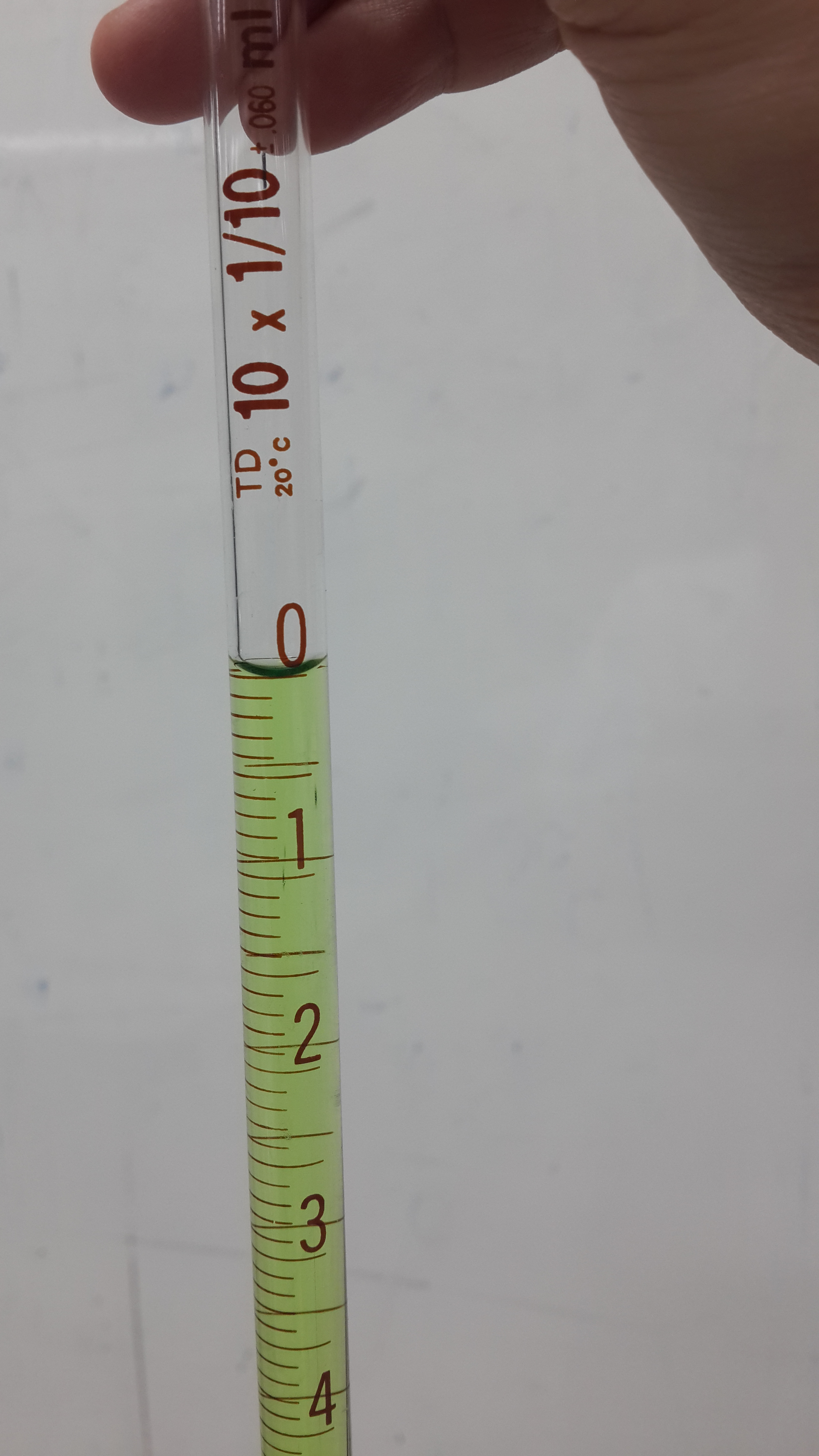
A meniscus formed by the solution with low viscosity. Make sure to look at the bottom of the curve when reading the measurement.

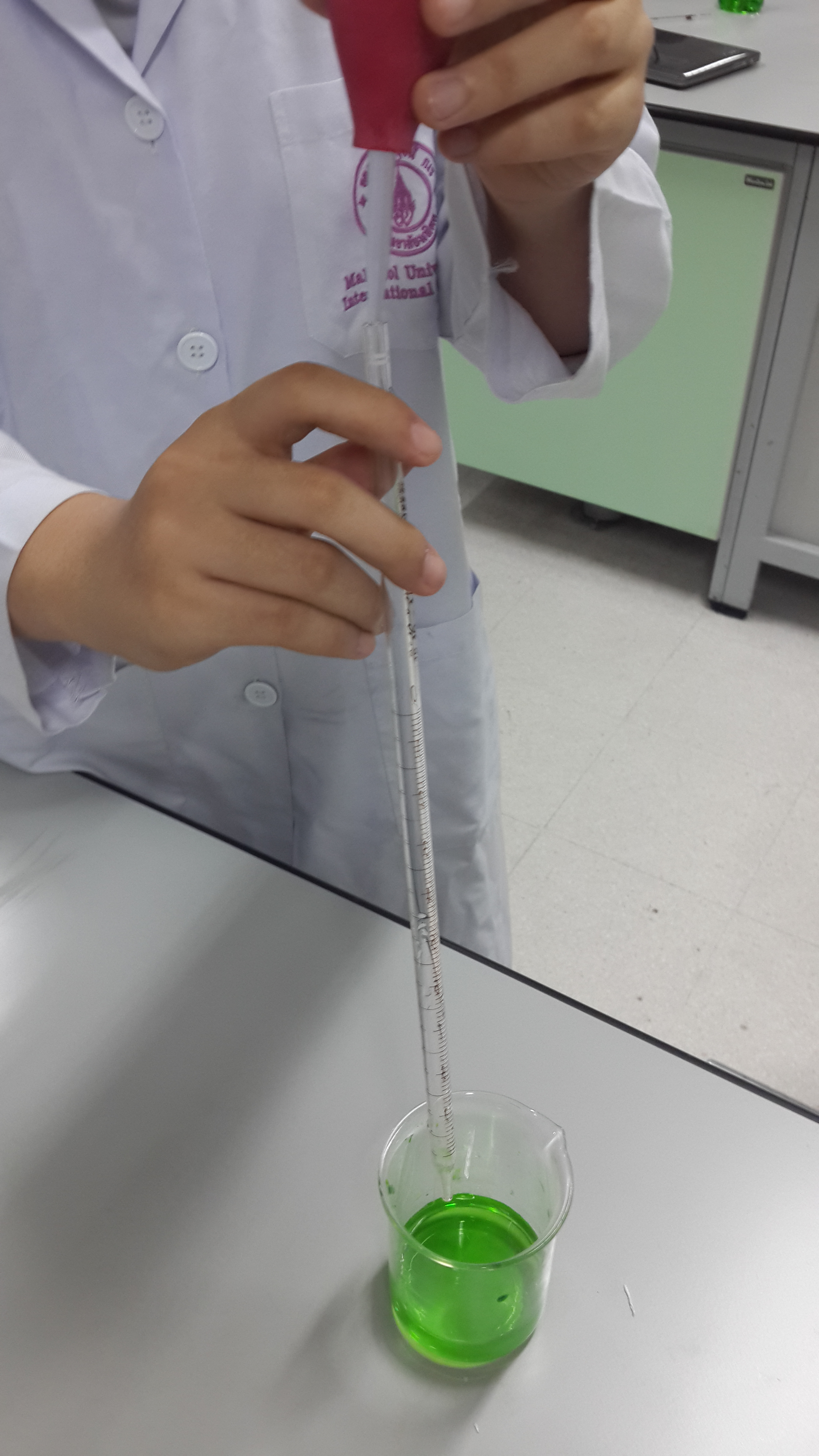
A person blowing the pipette using a rubber bulb. Notice the two rings in the upper end of the pipette, which indicates that this is a "blow-out" pipette.
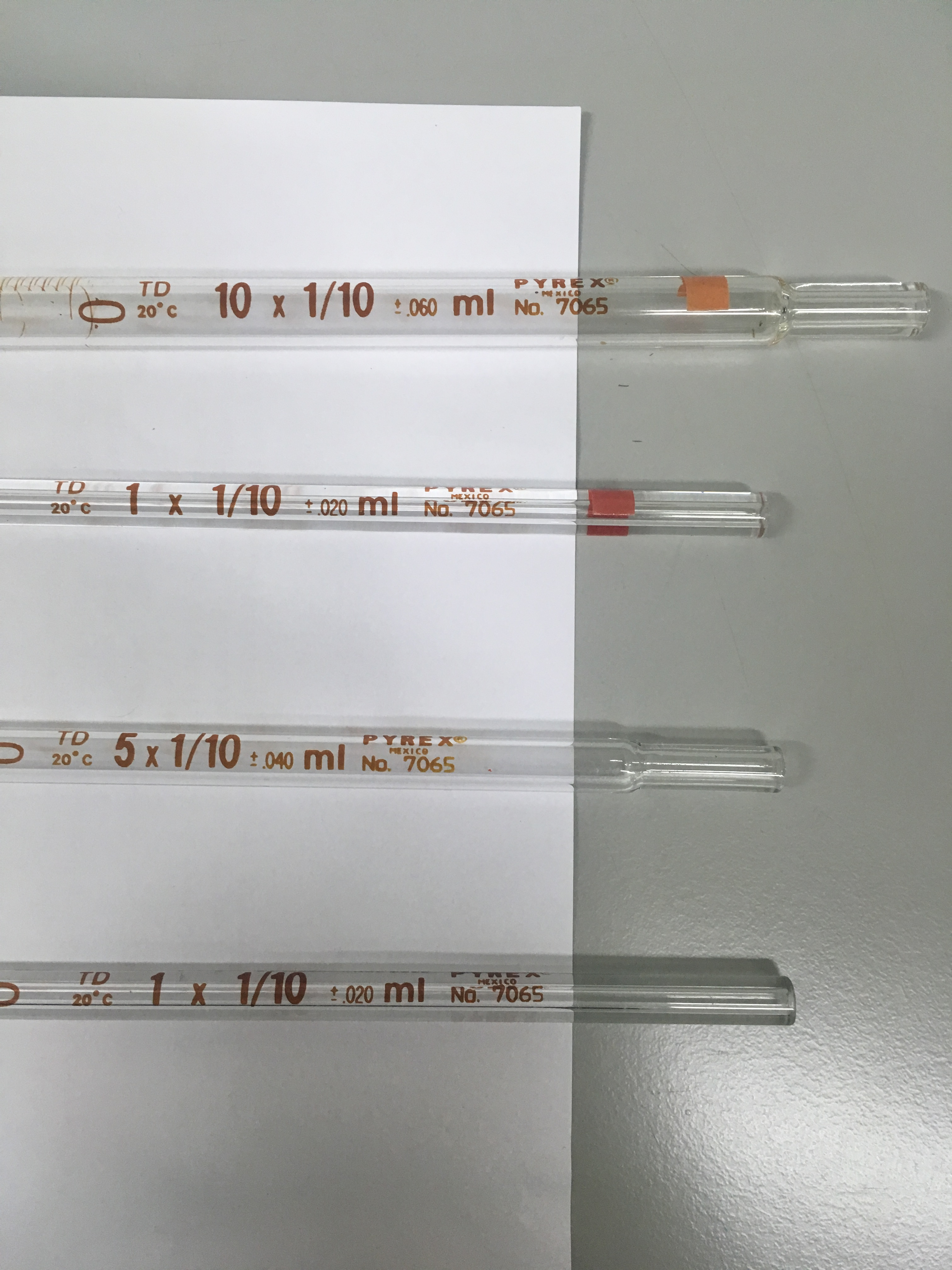
The rate of accuracy with "TD" indicated the flow level of the solution
