= Auguste-Arthur Plisson =

French chemist (died 1832)

Auguste-Arthur Plisson (died August 1832) was a French chemist. Born in Orléans, Plisson was orphaned at an early age, but overcame the difficulties that caused him with the determination he brought to being a student of chemistry in Paris. Taught by Noël-Étienne Henry, chief of the Central Pharmacy of Paris Hospitals (Pharmacie centrale des hôpitaux de Paris, today the Agence générale des équipements et produits de santé), he won several awards from the School of Pharmacy of Paris, including a gold medal for chemistry in 1823, and was eventually recruited by Henry to work for the Central Pharmacy. After several years, during which he published a number of papers on chemical discoveries, he was appointed deputy chief. He was also a member of the Société de Pharmacie (today the Académie nationale de pharmacie).

By the late 1820s, Plisson had become chief pharmacist at Paris's Pitié-Salpêtrière Hospital. In 1827, with Étienne-Ossian Henry, the son of his former tutor, he discovered aspartic acid.

Plisson died suddenly in 1832 as the result of an attack of cholera.

== Citations ==
- Méquignon, Paul, ed. (1834). "Plisson, Auguste-Arthur". Annuaire biographique, ou supplément annuel et continuation de toutes les biographies ou dictionnaires historiques: contenant la vie de tous les hommes célèbres par leurs écrits [Biographical Directory, or annual supplement and continuation of all biographies or historical dictionaries: containing the lives of famous men by their writings] (in French). Vol. 2, Années 1830-1834. Paris: Editions Lagny. p. 286.
- Berzelius, Jöns Jakob; Öngren, Olof Gustaf (1839). Traité de chimie [Treaty on chemistry] (in French). Vol. 3. Brussels: A. Wahlen et Cie. p. 81.
- Blondeau, A. (1832). "Notice nécrologique sur M. Plisson, ex-sous-chef de la Pharmacie centrale des hôpitaux, pharmacien en chef de la Pitié, membre de la Société de Pharmacie, etc." [Obituary notice for Mr. Plisson, former Deputy Chief of the Central Pharmacy Hospital, chief pharmacist of Mercy, a member of the Society of Pharmacy, etc.]. In Guibourt, Nicolas-Jean-Baptiste-Gaston (ed.). Concours sur l'acétification de l'alcool: question proposée par la société de pharmacie de Paris: séance publique de l'école et de la société de pharmacie réunies, concours de 1832 (in French). Paris: De Fain. p. 32.
- Dillemann, Georges (1985). "Les médailles récompenses des étudiants en pharmacie lauréats aux concours des prix. 2e partie: Les prix de l'École de Pharmacie de Paris (1804-1841)" [Medals Awarded to Pharmacy Students in Competitive Examination. Part 2: Prizes from the School of Pharmacy (1804-1841).]. Revue d'histoire de la pharmacie (in French). 73 (265): 178.
- Plimmer, R.H.A. (1912) [1908]. Plimmer, R.H.A.; Hopkins, F.G. (eds.). The chemical composition of the proteins. Monographs on biochemistry. Vol. Part I. Analysis (2 ed.). London: Longmans, Green and Co. p. 112.
- Schofield, M. (3 August 1968). "On the Sidelines: A Century-and-a-Half of Alkaloids". The Chemist and Druggist. 190 (4616). London: Morgan Brothers: 105.
