= British Institute of Non-Destructive Testing =

Professional association

The British Institute of Non-Destructive Testing or BINDT is a professional body for engineers and other technical professionals involved in non-destructive testing and condition monitoring in the United Kingdom. The institute was founded in 1976, by amalgamation of the Society of Non-Destructive Examination (SONDE) and the NDT Society of Great Britain (NDTS), which were both founded in 1954.

BINDT is a licensed member institution of the Engineering Council and a full member of the European Federation of NDT (EFNDT) and the International Committee for NDT (ICNDT). Their headquarters is located in Northampton, UK.

== Certification ==
BINDT maintains PCN (Personnel Certification in Non-Destructive Testing). PCN is a personnel certification scheme in NDT methods, welding inspection and condition monitoring, which is accredited by UKAS according to ISO 17024. PCN certification schemes for the major NDT methods conform to BS EN ISO 9712 (2012). PCN condition monitoring certification schemes in Vibration Analysis, Acoustic Emission, Infrared Thermography and Lubrication Management and Analysis conform to the appropriate parts of ISO 18436.

== Journal ==
BINDT publishes "Insight - Non-Destructive Testing and Condition Monitoring", which includes original research and development papers, technical and scientific reviews and case studies.

BINDT also publishes "NDT News". This is a trade magazine for NDT, inspection, condition monitoring and quality practitioners. It is sent free of charge to its members and to PCN certified personnel.
