= Aspartic acid (data page) =

Chemical data page

The complete data for Aspartic acid
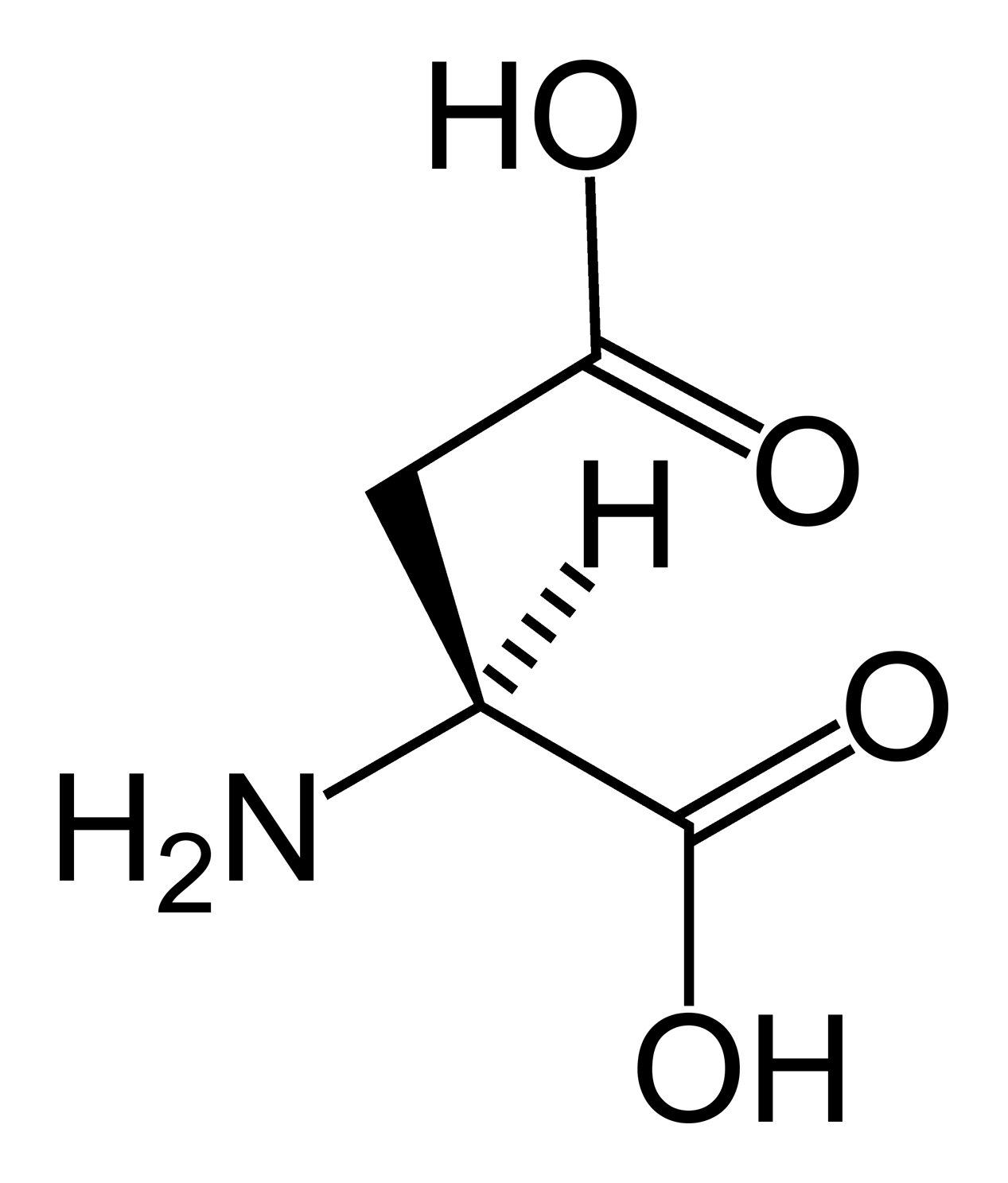
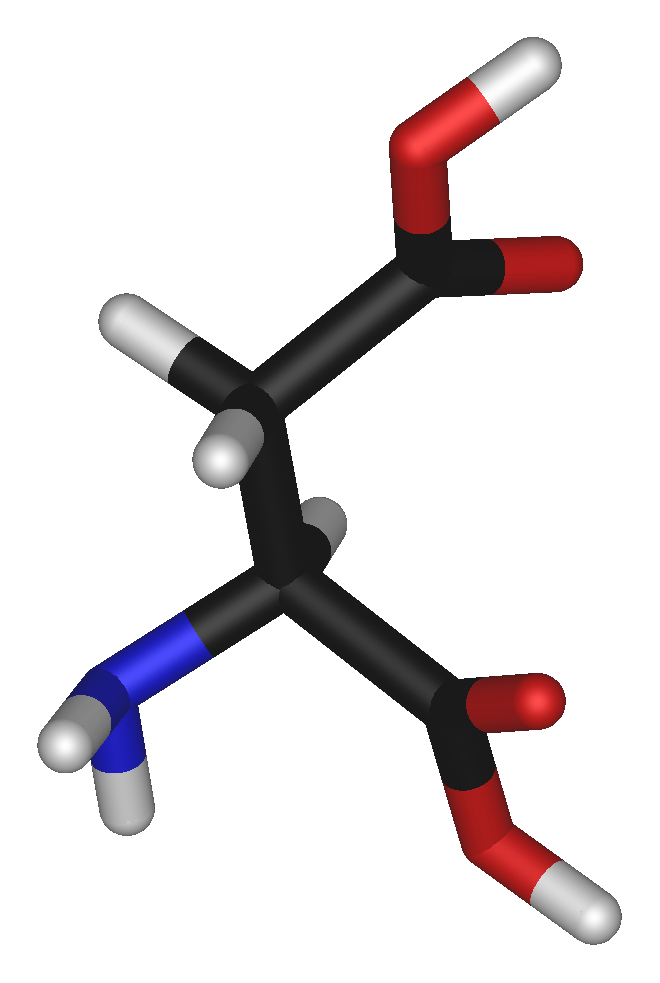
General information
Chemical formula: C_{4}H_{7}NO_{4}
Molar mass: 133.102 g·mol^{−1}
Systematic name:
(2S)-2-aminobutanedioic acid
Synonyms:
AIDS{-}001654
AIDS001654
{(α/2)/(DL)}-aminosuccinic acid
(DL)-Asparagic acid
(DL)-Asparaginic acid
Aspartate
{(+-)/(DL)/(RS)}-Aspartic acid
CHEBI:22660
CHEMBANK2882
CPD-302
NSC141379
NSC167399
NSC3973
NSC620336
NSC79553
NSC97922
Spartase
Database data
SMILES: D - C([C@H](C(=O)O)N)C(=O)O; L - C([C@@H](C(=O)O)N)C(=O)O;
InChI=1/C4H7NO4/c5-2(4(8)9)1-3(6)7/h2H,1,5H2,(H,6,7)(H,8,9)/f/h6,8H

ATC: N/A	CAS: [56-84-8]	DrugBank: N/A	EINECS: 200-291-6	PubChem: 83887 (D)^{a} , 5960 (L)^{a}

Physical properties

Structure	Crystal data	Spectral data: UV-Vis / IR / NMR / MS: Masses of main fragments: GMD MS Spectrum

Phase behavior	Solid properties ρ_{solid}: 1.66 g.cm^{−3} T_{m}: 270-271 °C	Liquid properties	Gas properties

Hazard properties

MSDS N/A	Main hazards: N/A	NFPA 704	Flash point: N/A	RTECS number: N/A

Chemical properties

XLogP: -3.236	pI: 2.77	pK_{a}: 1.95; 3.71; 9.66	Tautomers:	Hydrogen bond: donor - 3; acceptor - 5

Pharmacological properties

This box:
- Except where noted otherwise, data relate to Standard temperature and pressure.
- Reliability of data general note.
