= Noël-Étienne Henry =

French chemist

Noël-Étienne Henry (26 November 1769, Beauvais – 30 July 1832) was a French chemist and Chief Pharmacist of the hospitals of Paris. He was father of Étienne-Ossian Henry (1798–1873) and grandfather of Emmanuel-Ossian Henry (1826-1867).

== Works ==
- Pharmacopee raisonée, ou Traité de Pharmacie pratique et théorique Nicolas-Jean-Baptiste-Gaston Guibourt, Noël-Étienne Henry - 1838 (2e Ed.) Digital edition by the University and State Library Düsseldorf
- Pharmacopée raisonnée, ou Traité de pharmacie pratique et théorique Nicolas-Jean-Baptiste-Gaston Guibourt, Noël-Étienne Henry - 1841
