= Aspartate ammonia-lyase =

aspartate ammonia-lyase
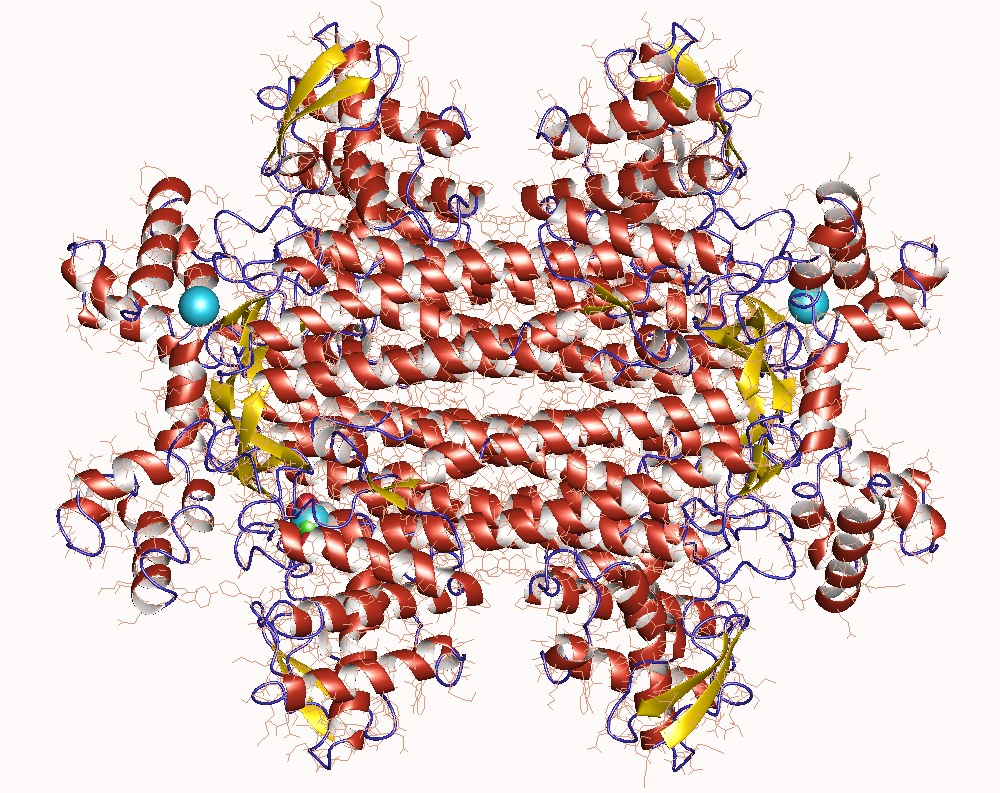
- Aspartate ammonia-lyase homotetramer, Bacillus sp. YM55-1

Identifiers
- EC no.: 4.3.1.1
- CAS no.: 9027-30-9

Databases
- IntEnz: IntEnz view
- BRENDA: BRENDA entry
- ExPASy: NiceZyme view
- KEGG: KEGG entry
- MetaCyc: metabolic pathway
- PRIAM: profile
- PDB structures: RCSB PDB PDBe PDBsum
- Gene Ontology: AmiGO / QuickGO
Search
- PMC: articles
- PubMed: articles
- NCBI: proteins

The enzyme aspartate ammonia-lyase (EC 4.3.1.1) catalyzes the chemical reaction

L-aspartate $\rightleftharpoons$ fumarate + NH_{3}

The reaction is the basis of the industrial synthesis of aspartate.

This enzyme belongs to the family of lyases, specifically ammonia lyases, which cleave carbon-nitrogen bonds. The systematic name of this enzyme class is L-aspartate ammonia-lyase (fumarate-forming). Other names in common use include aspartase, fumaric aminase, L-aspartase, and L-aspartate ammonia-lyase. This enzyme participates in alanine and aspartate metabolism and nitrogen metabolism.

== Structural studies ==
As of late 2007, two structures have been solved for this class of enzymes, with PDB accession codes 1J3U and 1JSW.
