= Étienne-Ossian Henry =

French chemist

Étienne-Ossian Henry (27 November 1798 in Paris – 26 August 1873) was a French chemist, son of Noël-Étienne Henry (1769–1832), and trained by his father, who was director of the Central Pharmacy of the Parisian hospitals and professor in the School of Pharmacy. In 1824, he became director of the chemical laboratory of the Academy of Medicine. He discovered sinapin and studied mineral waters, the milk of various animals, nicotine, and tannin. In 1827, with Auguste-Arthur Plisson, who had studied under his father, he discovered aspartic acid.

In 1845, he invented the first true burette for titration, which is a widely used device in analytical chemistry and related fields.

His son was Emmanuel-Ossian Henry (1826-1867).

== Works ==
His works include:

- Traité pratique d'analyse chimique des eaux minérales (second edition, 1858), with his father
- Mémoiré sur l'analyse organique (1830), with Plisson
- Analyse chimique des eaux qui alimentent les fontaines publiques de Paris (1848), with Boutron-Gharland
- A translation of the Codex Medicamentarius (1827), with Ratier
