= Karl Friedrich Mohr =

German chemist (1806–1879)

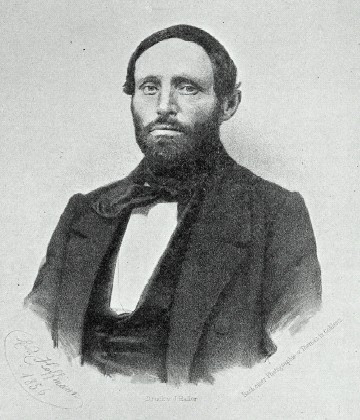
- Karl Friedrich Mohr
- Born: 4 November 1806; Koblenz, Rhin-et-Moselle, French Empire
- Died: 28 September 1879 (aged 72); Bonn, German Empire
- Known for: Burette; Law of conservation of energy Volumetric analysis Mohr method Mohr pipette Mohr's salt
- Scientific career
- Fields: Analytical chemistry

Karl Friedrich Mohr (November 4, 1806 – September 28, 1879) was a German chemist famous for his early statement of the principle of the conservation of energy. Ammonium iron(II) sulfate, (NH_{4})_{2}Fe(SO_{4})_{2}.6H_{2}O, is named Mohr's salt after him.

== Life ==
Mohr was born in 1806 into the family of a prosperous druggist in Koblenz. The young Mohr received much of his early education at home, a great part of it in his father's laboratory. This experience may be responsible for much of the skill Mohr later showed in devising instruments and methods of chemical analysis. At the age of twenty-one he began to study chemistry under Leopold Gmelin, and, after five years in Heidelberg, Berlin and Bonn, he returned with the degree of PhD to join his father's establishment.

Mohr's father died during 1840 at which time Mohr assumed control of the family business. He retired from it for a life of scientific leisure in 1857, but at the age of fifty-seven some serious financial losses caused him to become a privatdozent in Bonn. In 1859, Mohr was one of the 56 founding members of the Freies Deutsches Hochstift (Free German Foundation). In 1867 he was appointed, by the direct influence of the government, extraordinary professor of pharmacy.

== Work ==
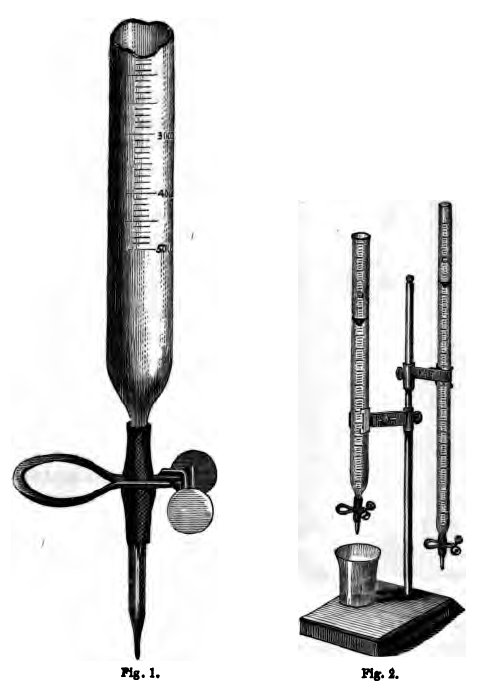
Mohr burette

Mohr was the leading scientific chemist of his time in Germany, and the inventor of many improvements in analytical methodology. He invented an improved burette which had a tip at the bottom and a clamp (a 'Mohr's clip'), which made it much easier to use than its predecessors, which were more similar to a graduated cylinder. His methods of volumetric analysis were expounded in his Lehrbuch der chemisch-analytischen Titrir-methode (1855) (Instructional Book of Titration Methods in Analytical Chemistry), which won special commendation from Liebig and ran to many editions. His Geschichte der Erde, eine Geologie auf neuer Grundlage (1866) (History of the Earth, a Geology on a New Basis), was also widely circulated.

In a paper Über die Natur der Wärme (1837), Mohr gave one of the earliest general statements of the doctrine of the conservation of energy:

besides the 54 known chemical elements there is in the physical world one agent only, and this is called Kraft (energy). It may appear, according to circumstances, as motion, chemical affinity, cohesion, electricity, light and magnetism; and from any one of these forms it can be transformed into any of the others.

== Selected writings ==
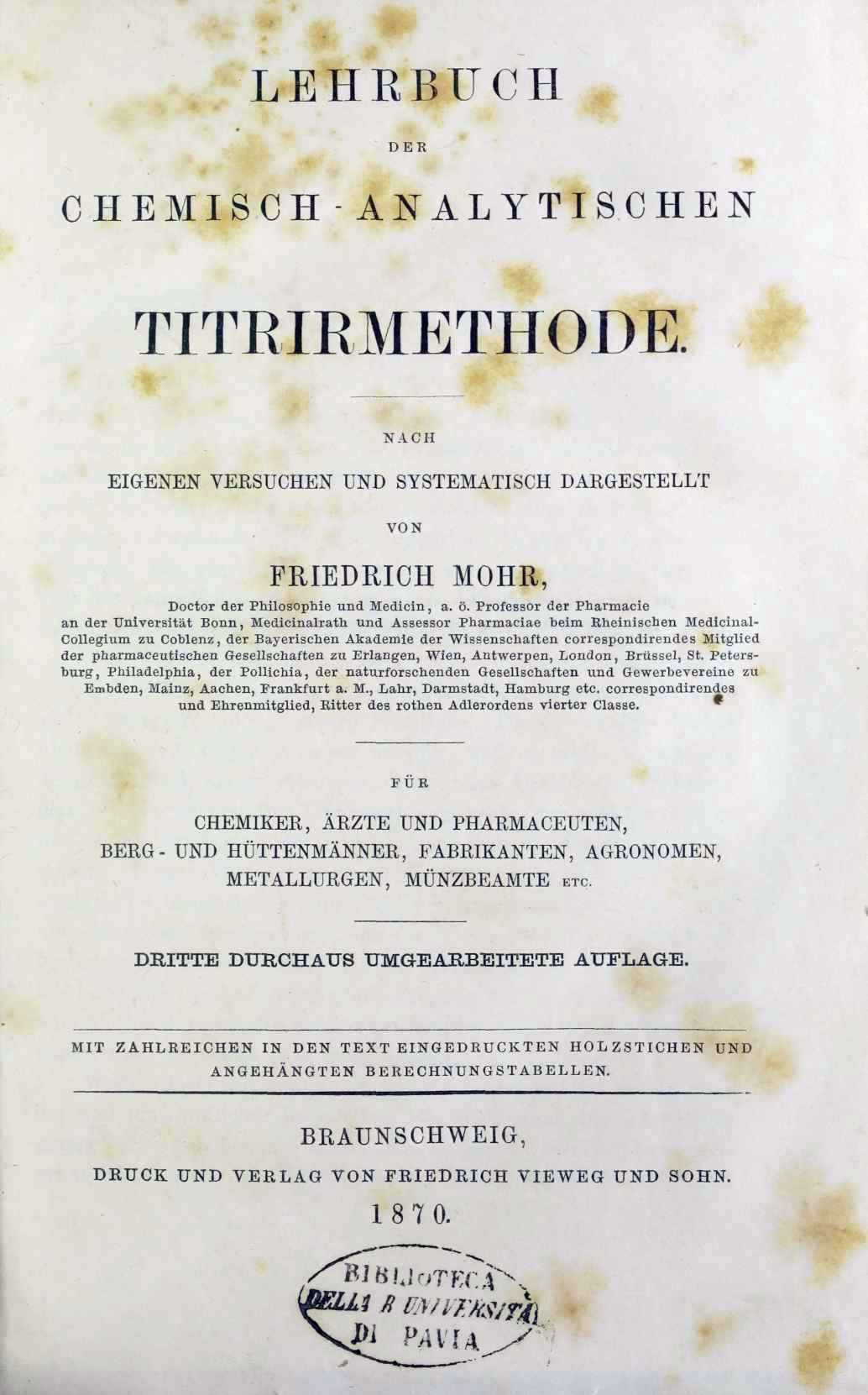
Lehrbuch der chemisch-analytischen Titrirmethode, 1870

- Lehrbuch der pharmaceutischen Technik. Braunschweig: Friedrich Bieweg, 1847. 1866 edition digitized This was the first textbook of pharmacy. It was translated and adapted to English practice by Theophilus Redwood. The US version was translated and adapted by William Procter, Jr.
- Commentar zur Preußischen Pharmacopoe nebst Übersetzung des Textes : nach der 6. Aufl. der Pharmacopoea Borussica bearbeitet; für Apotheker, Aerzte und Medicinal-Beamte . Band 1 . Vieweg, Braunschweig 1848 Digital edition by the University and State Library Düsseldorf
- Commentar zur Preußischen Pharmacopoe nebst Übersetzung des Textes : nach der 6. Aufl. der Pharmacopoea Borussica bearbeitet; für Apotheker, Aerzte und Medicinal-Beamte . Band 2 . Vieweg, Braunschweig 1849 Digital edition by the University and State Library Düsseldorf
- Commentar zur preussischen Pharmacopoe nebst Übersetzung des Textes : nach der sechsten Auflage der Pharmacopoea Borussica; für Apotheker, Ärzte und Medicinal-Beamte Vol.1-2 . Vieweg, Braunschweig 2nd edition 1854 Digital edition by the University and State Library Düsseldorf
- Lehrbuch der chemisch-analytischen Titriermethode : für Chemiker, Ärzte u. Pharmaceuten, Berg- und Hüttenmänner, Fabrikanten, Agronomen, Metallurgen, Münzbeamte etc.; nach eigenen Versuchen und systematisch dargestellt . Vieweg, Braunschweig 3. Aufl. 1870 Digital edition by the University and State Library Düsseldorf
- Mohr, Friedrich (1877). Lehrbuch der chemisch-analytischen Titrirmethode: Nach eigenen versuchen. Braunschweig: Freidrich Vieweg und Sohn. p. 80. "Lehrbuch der chemisch-analytischen Titrir-methode."

- Based on Mohr's work

== See also ==
- Mohr method
