= Nicolas-Jean-Baptiste-Gaston Guibourt =

French pharmacist

Nicolas-Jean-Baptiste-Gaston Guibourt was a French pharmacist. He was born in Paris on July 2, 1790, and died on August 22, 1867, in the same city.

Nicolas Guibourt received his diploma of Pharmacy in 1816 from the École Spéciale de Pharmacie, with a thesis on the oxides and sulfides of mercury.

He became member of the Académie de Médécine in 1824, and professor of the École de Pharmacie in 1832.
