= Burette =

Graduated glass tube with a tap at one end

A burette (also spelled buret) is a graduated glass tube with a tap at one end, for delivering known volumes of a liquid, especially in titrations. It is a long, graduated glass tube, with a stopcock at its lower end and a tapered capillary tube at the stopcock's outlet. The flow of liquid from the tube to the burette tip is controlled by the stopcock valve.

There are two main types of burette; the volumetric burette and the piston burette. A volumetric burette delivers measured volumes of liquid. Piston burettes are similar to syringes, but with a precision bore and a plunger. Piston burettes may be manually operated or may be motorized. A weight burette delivers measured weights of a liquid.

== Overview ==
A burette is a volumetric measuring glassware which is used in analytical chemistry for the accurate dispensing of a liquid, especially of one of the reagents in a titration. The burette tube carries graduated marks from which the dispensed volume of the liquid can be determined. Compared to a volumetric pipette, a burette has similar precision if used to its full capacity, but as it is usually used to deliver less than its full capacity, a burette is slightly less precise than a pipette.

The burette is used to measure the volume of a dispensed substance, but is different from a graduated cylinder as its graduations measure from top to bottom. Therefore, the difference between the starting and the final volume is equal to the amount dispensed. The precision and control of the burette over other means of adding solution is beneficial for use in titration.

== Volumetric burette ==
A volumetric burette can be made of glass or plastic, and is a straight tube with a graduation scale. At the tip of a burette, there is a stopcock and valve to control the flow of the chemical solution. The barrel of the stopcock can be made of glass or the plastic PTFE. Stopcocks with glass barrels need to be lubricated with vaseline or a specialized grease. Burettes are manufactured for specific tolerances, designated as class A or B and this also is etched on the glass.

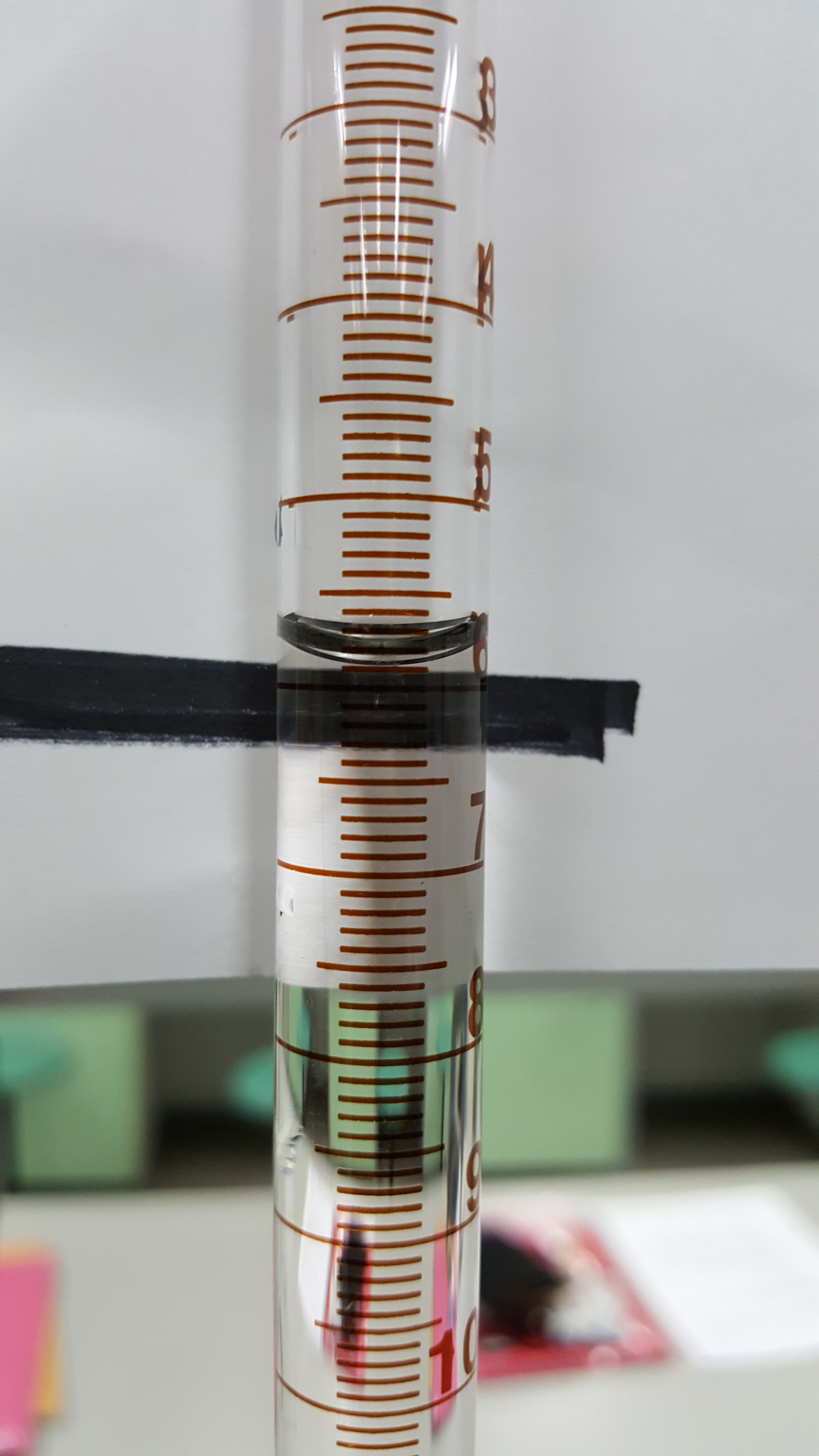
Black strip technique

=== Burette reading ===
In order to measure the amount of solution added in or drained out, the burette must be observed at eye level straight to the bottom of the meniscus. The liquid in the burette should be completely free of bubbles to ensure accurate measurements. The difference in volume can be calculated by taking the difference of the final and initial recorded volume. Using the burette with a colorless solution may make it difficult to observe the bottom of the meniscus, so the black strip technique can make it easier to accurately observe and record measurements.

=== Specification ===
The specification of a volumetric burette indicates its properties, such as the nominal volume, volume unit, error limit, and accuracy class, plus other related details from the manufacturer. The nominal volume and error limit is usually given in units of mL or cm^{3}. Another specification commonly found on burettes is the calibration mark "TD" or "Ex". This stands for "calibrated to deliver", indicating that the printed volume is accurate when the burette is used to deliver (rather than contain) a solution. Another commonly indicated specification is the accuracy class, including class A and class B. Class A is preferred to Class B when volumetric accuracy is important, as it has a narrower range of error with accuracy up to 0.1 percent compared to 0.2 percent in Class B burette.

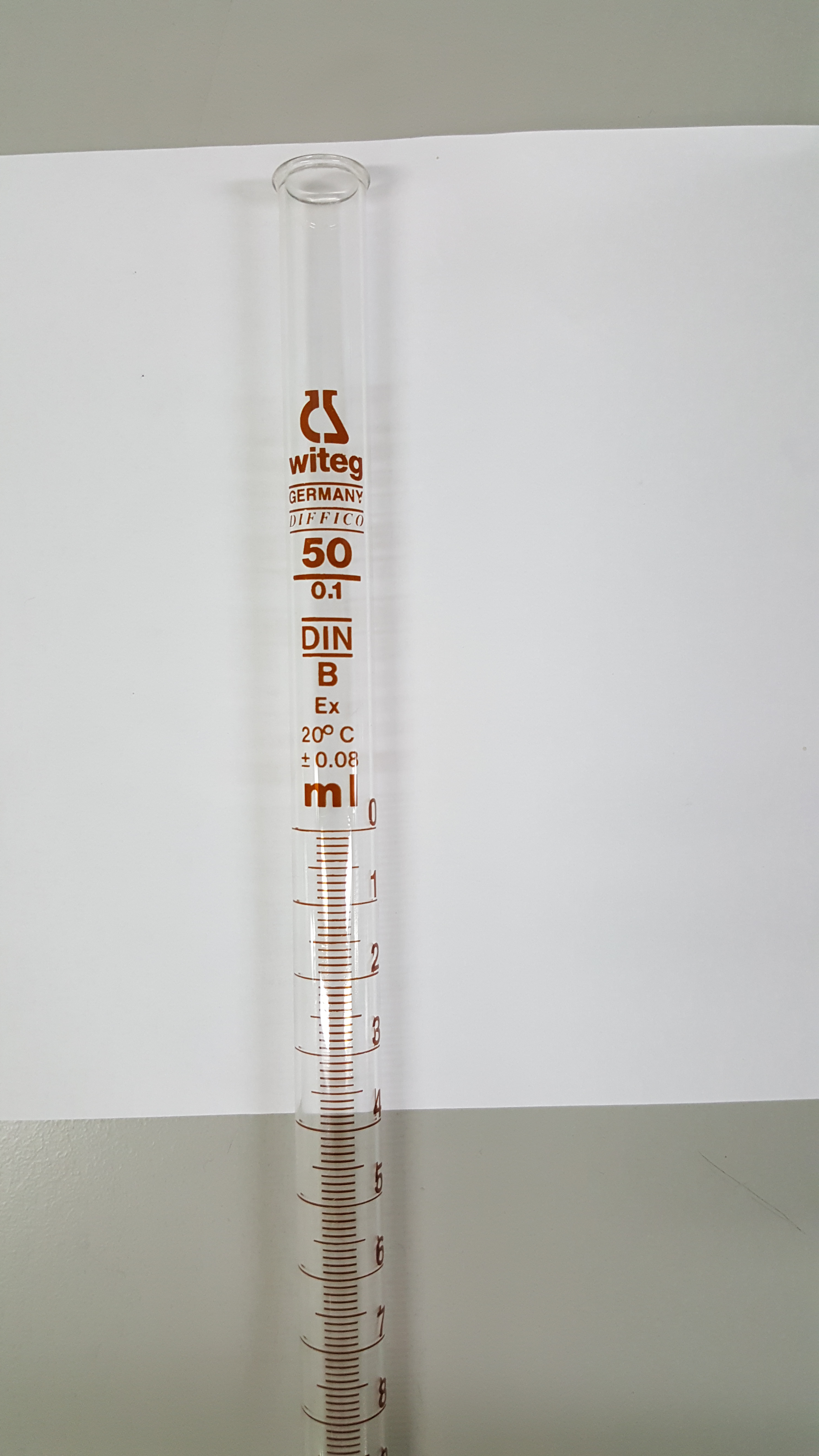
Specification (on top of the burette)

== Digital burette ==
Digital burettes are based on a syringe design. The barrel and plunger may be made of glass. With liquids that corrode glass, including solutions of alkali, the barrel and plunger may be made of polyethylene or another resistant plastic material. The barrel is held in a fixed position and the plunger is moved incrementally either by turning wheel by hand, or by means of a step motor. The volume is shown on a digital display. A high-precision syringe may be used to deliver very precise aliquots. Motorized digital burettes may be controlled by a computer; for example, a titration may be recorded digitally and then subject to numerical processing to find the titer at an end-point.

== History ==
The first burette was invented in 1845 by the French chemist Étienne-Ossian Henry (1798–1873). In 1855, the German chemist Karl Friedrich Mohr (1806–1879) presented an improved version of Henry's burette, having graduations inscribed on the tube of the burette.

The word "burette" was coined in 1824 by the French chemist Joseph Louis Gay-Lussac (1778–1850).

== Additional images ==
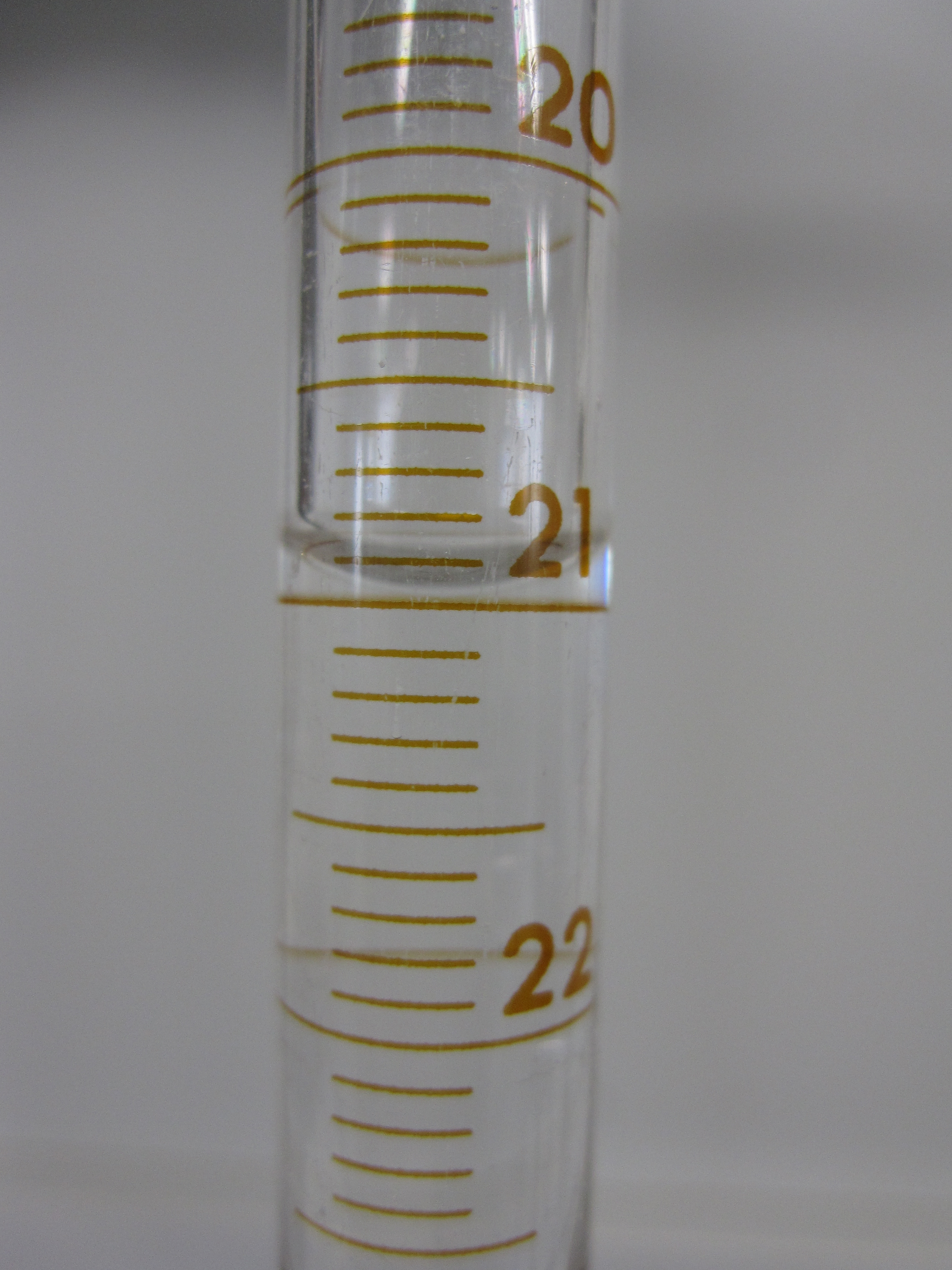
Meniscus

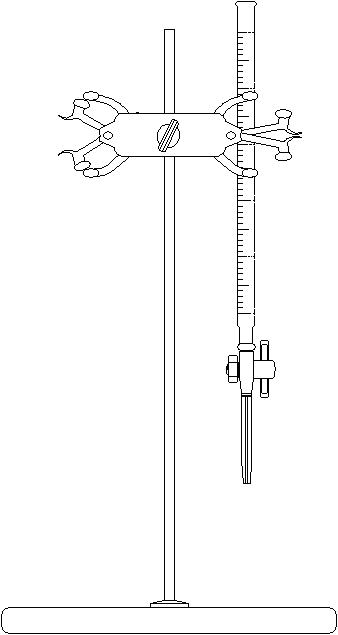

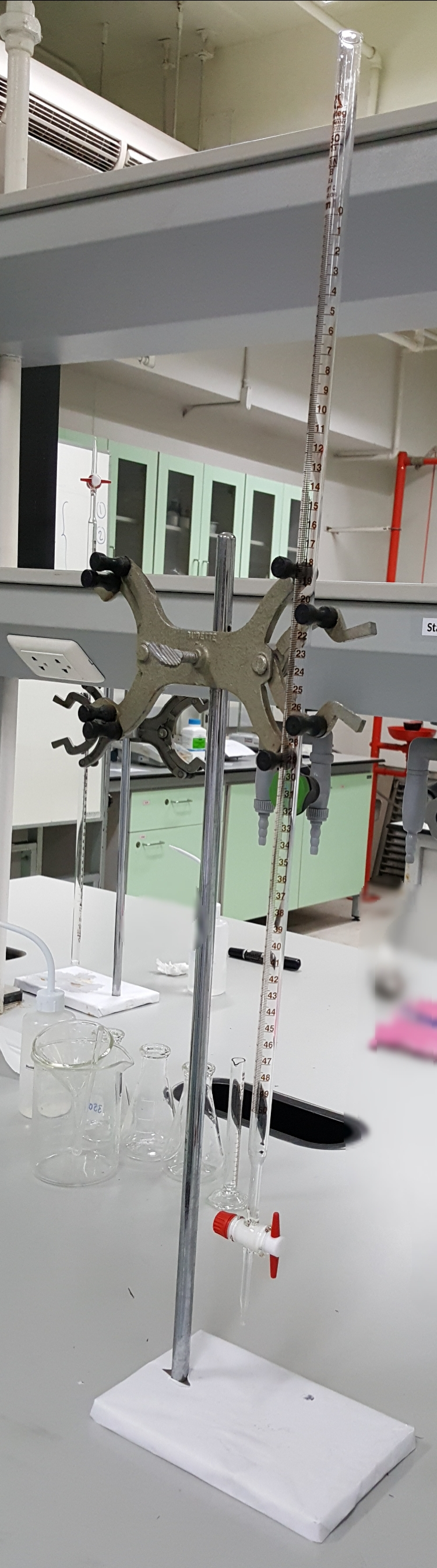
Burette with ring stand

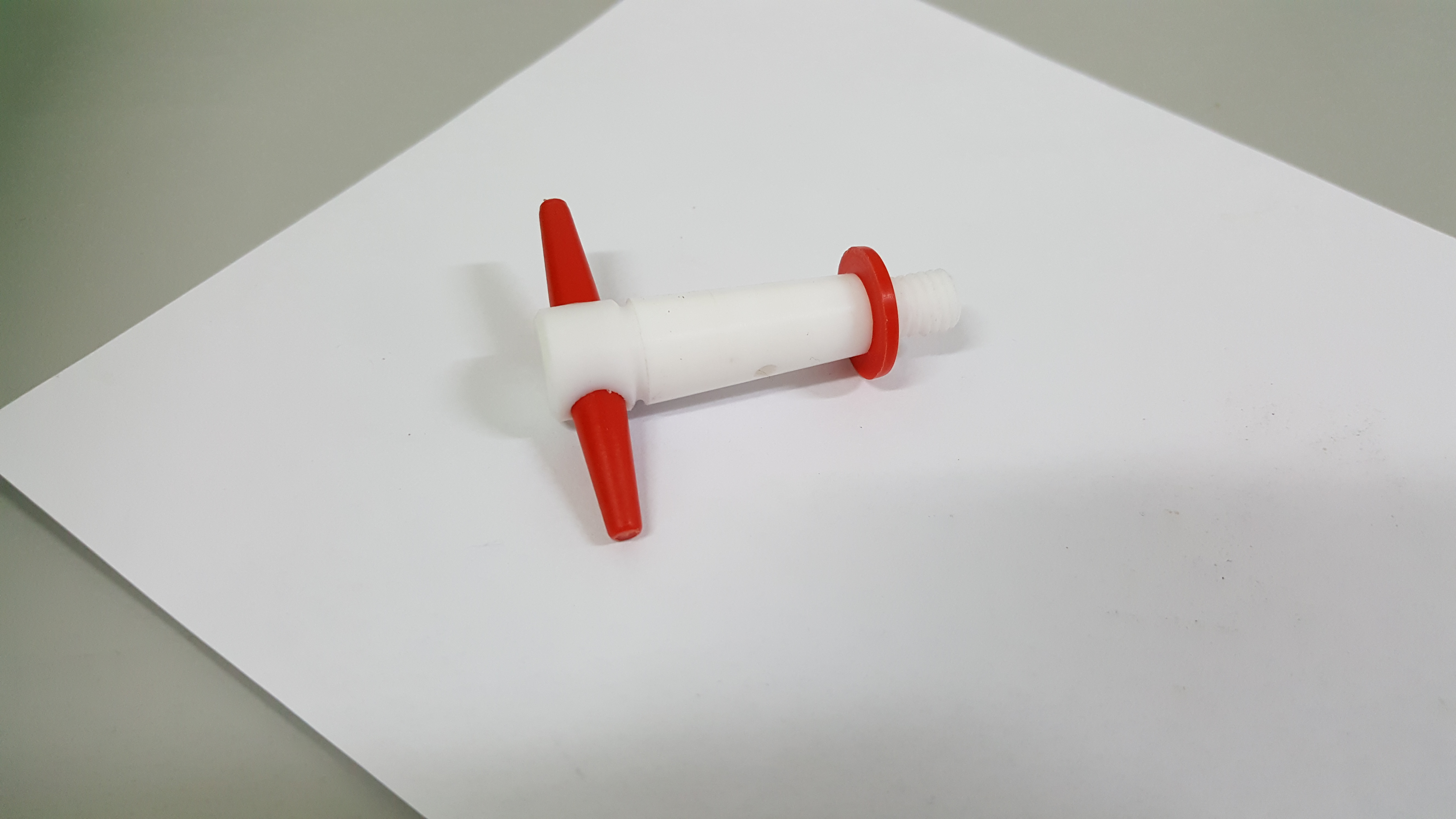
Plastic stopcock used in glass volumetric burette
