= Lead hydroxide =

Lead hydroxide may refer to:

- Lead(II) hydroxide
- Triphenyl lead hydroxide
