= DIN EN ISO 9712 =

DIN EN ISO 9712:2012 is a certification issued by the German institute for standardization (Deutsches Institut für Normung). It certifies personnel working in Non-destructive testing. This standard evaluates and documents the competence of personnel whose tasks require knowledge of non-destructive tests. The certification process is performed by authorized independent certification bodies, such as Sector Cert, DQS, TÜV, DEKRA etc. They can be applied at the German accreditation body (Deutsche Akkreditierungsstelle GmbH, DAkkS).

== Certification process ==
To be accepted for the certification exam, applicants have to:

- visit a course
- provide a proof of good eyesight
- fulfill the required practical experience in non-destructive testing

After the exam has been successfully passed and the full industry experience can be proved, the certificate itself can be applied for. The certification stays valid for five years and has to be renewed. While this only includes a new application form, recertification after ten years consists of a further examination.

== Replacement of DIN EN 473 and DIN EN ISO 9712 ==
DIN EN ISO 9712:2012 was introduced in January 2013. DIN EN 473, as well as the former version of DIN EN ISO 9712 (DIN EN ISO 9712:2005), were replaced. Despite many similarities, the new version of DIN EN ISO 9712 contains numerous alterations:

For example, the updated standard consists of new testing methods, such as infrared thermography or testing with strain gauges.
The required practical experience in non-destructive testing before certification has also been introduced with the new ISO 9712.
Furthermore, written electronic tests can be taken online now.
