= Volumetric pipette =

Precise measurement glassware

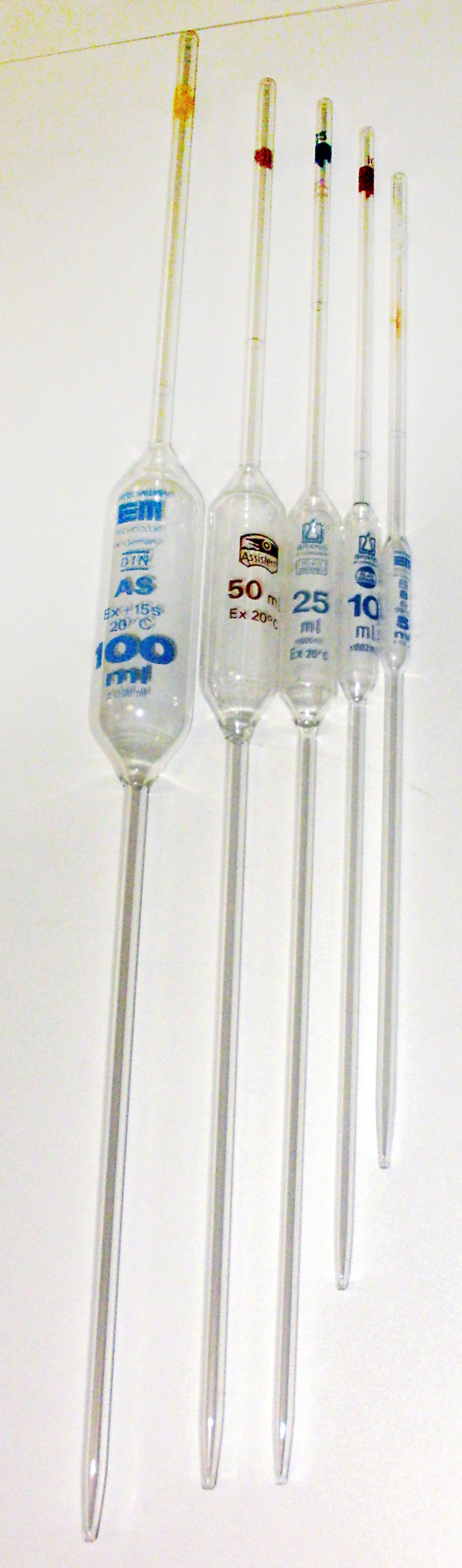
Several sizes of volumetric pipette

A volumetric pipette, bulb pipette, or belly pipette allows extremely accurate measurement (to four significant figures) of the volume of a solution. It is calibrated to deliver accurately a fixed volume of liquid.

These pipettes have a large bulb with a long narrow portion above with a single graduation mark as it is calibrated for a single volume (like a volumetric flask). Typical volumes are 1, 2, 5, 10, 20, 25, 50 and 100 mL. Volumetric pipettes are commonly used in analytical chemistry to make laboratory solutions from a base stock as well as to prepare solutions for titration.

ASTM standard E969 defines the standard tolerance for volumetric transfer pipettes. The tolerance depends on the size: a 0.5-mL pipette has a tolerance of ±0.006 mL, while a 50-mL pipette has a tolerance of ±0.05 mL. (These are for Class A pipettes; Class B pipettes are given a tolerance of twice that for the corresponding Class A.)

A specialized example of a volumetric pipette is the microfluid pipette (capable of dispensing as little as 10 μL) designed with a circulating liquid tip that generates a self-confining volume in front of its outlet channels.

== History ==
Pyrex started to make laboratory equipment in 1916 and became a favorite brand for the scientific community due to the borosilicate glass's natural properties. These included strength against; chemicals, thermal shift, and mechanical stress.
