= Rainin =

American manufacturer of pipettes and liquid handlers

Mettler-Toledo Rainin
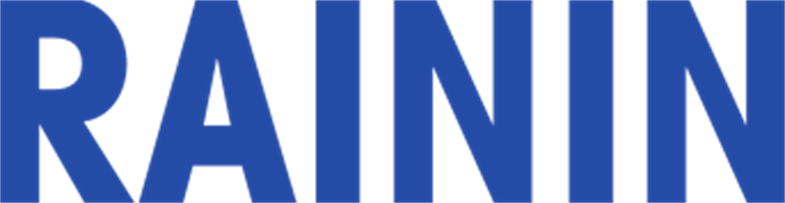
- Company type: Subsidiary
- Industry: Scientific instruments
- Predecessor: Rainin Instrument Company
- Founded: 1963; 63 years ago
- Founder: Kenneth Rainin
- Headquarters: Oakland, California, U.S.
- Key people: Cameron Barnard (General Manager)
- Products: Pipettes; Liquid handling robots; Laboratory Equipments
- Parent: METTLER TOLEDO

Mettler-Toledo Rainin is a global supplier of laboratory pipettes, liquid handling instruments, consumables, and services for life science, biotechnology, and pharmaceutical research and development. Based in Oakland, California, Rainin is part of METTLER TOLEDO, a multinational supplier of precision instruments and services.

== History ==
Kenneth Rainin founded Rainin Instrument Company in 1963 as a distributor of laboratory instruments and supplies.

Rainin began distributing adjustable volume pipettes in 1972 and manufacturing its own in 1980.

In 1999, Rainin launched the LiteTouch System (LTS) to improve pipetting ergonomics by reducing tip loading and ejection forces. LTS pipettes have been recognized for their ergonomic benefits.

METTLER TOLEDO acquired Rainin for $292.2 million in 2001.

As a response to pipette tip shortages during the COVID-19 pandemic, Rainin was awarded a $35.8 million contract from the US Department of Defense to expand domestic production capacity for pipette tips. Rainin subsequently opened a new manufacturing facility in Vacaville, CA in 2022 and installed an in-house electron-beam sterilizer in 2023.
