= Forward pipetting =

Expulsion Technique in applied Chemistry

Forward pipetting is a technique to dispense a measured quantity of liquid by means of air displacement pipette. The technique is mainly recommended for aqueous solutions, such as buffers, or diluted acids or alkalis. In case of solutions with a high viscosity or a tendency to foam, reverse pipetting is more suitable.

== How it works ==
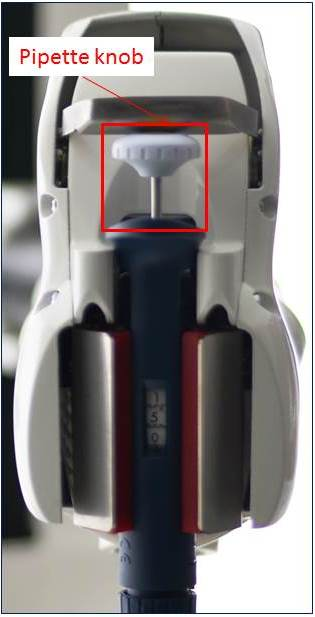
Example of pipette held by robotic hand

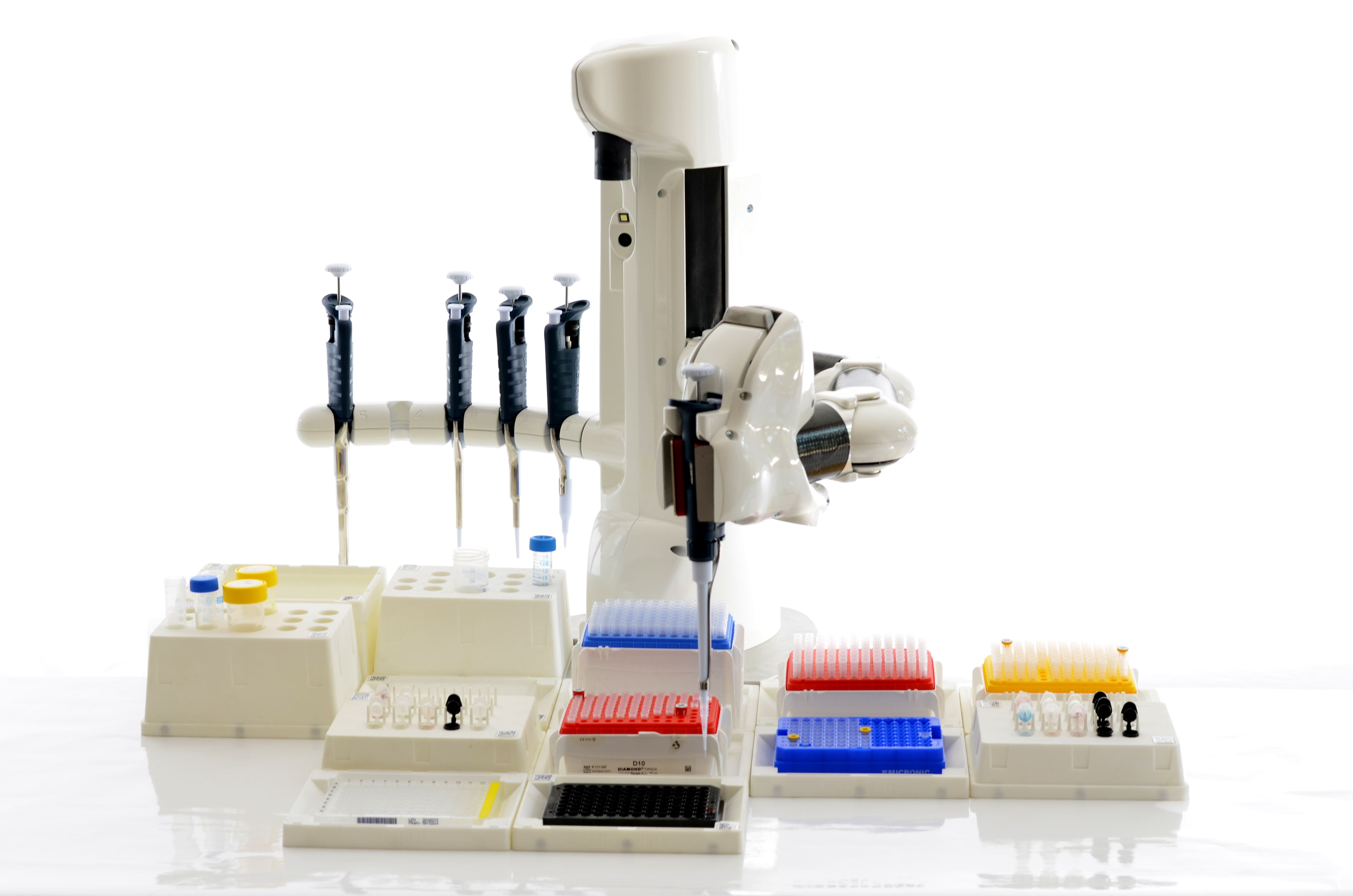
Liquid handling robot capable of forward pipetting by means of manual pipette

In forward pipetting, an exactly set volume of liquid is aspired to the tip and then it is delivered to a new vessel. This is achieved by creating vacuum by means of the vertical travel of a metal or ceramic piston within an airtight sleeve. As the piston moves upward, driven by the depression of the plunger, a vacuum is created in the space left vacant by the piston. Air from the tip rises to fill the space left vacant, and the tip air is then replaced by the liquid, which is drawn up into the tip and thus available for transport and dispensing elsewhere.

When the pipette knob is pressed on an air displacement pipette, the piston inside the instrument moves down to let air out. Air is displaced by the piston. The volume of air displaced is equivalent to the volume of liquid aspirated. These pipettes are capable of being very precise and accurate. However, since they rely on air displacement, they are subject to inaccuracies caused by the changing environment, particularly temperature and user technique. For these reasons, this equipment must be carefully maintained and calibrated, and users must be trained to exercise correct and consistent technique. Alternative solutions to improve reproducibility and accuracy of manual pipetting operations are based on liquid handling robots capable of handling air displacement pipettes.

== Technique ==
=== Forward pipetting ===
The standard forward pipetting technique is used to dispense and mix a sample or reagent into another liquid

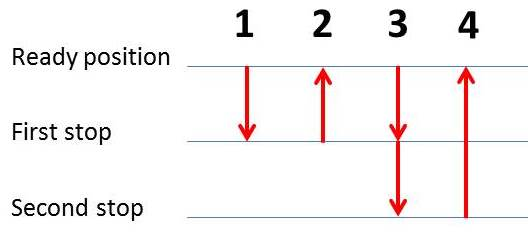
1. Once a suitable tip is attached to the pipette, press its knob to the first stop. Dip the tip into the solution to a certain depth according to the volume set.
2. Afterwards slowly release the pipette knob till the starting position. Withdraw the tip from the liquid.
3. Move the pipette to the receiving vessel and dispense the liquid by gently pressing the pipette knob to the first stop. After about one second, keep on pressing pipette knob to the second stop. This action will completely empty the tip from the liquid.
4. Afterwards withdraw the tip from the liquid and release the pipette to the ready position.

=== Pipetting of heterogeneous samples ===
When prerinsing tip is not possible and the full sample must be dispensed for correct analysis, the following alternative of forward pipetting is preferred. Indeed, this technique is used for pipetting heterogeneous samples, such as blood or serum.

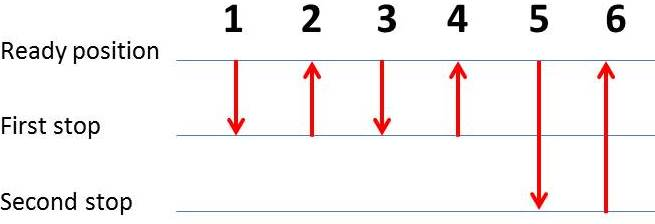
1. Once a suitable tip is attached to the pipette, press its knob to the first stop.Dip the tip into the source sample. Make sure the tip is sufficiently below the liquid surface.
2. Release the pipette knob slowly to the ready position. This action will fill the tip with the sample. Remove the tip from the solution. Dip the tip into the target solution. Make sure the tip is sufficiently below the liquid surface.
3. Press again the pipette knob to the first stop to dispense the liquid from the tip.
4. Release the pipette knob slowly to the ready position. Do not remove the tip from the solution. Repeat this process (step 3 and 4) to rinse the tip until the interior wall of the tip is clear.
5. Remove the tip from the solution. Press the pipette knob to the second stop, and completely empty the tip.
6. Release the pipette knob to the ready position.

== Sources ==
- Guide to pipetting
- Wikilectures: Pipettors

== See also ==
- Automated pipetting system
- Liquid handling robot
- Pipette
- Air displacement pipette
- Reverse pipetting
