= Reverse pipetting =

Technique of liquid dispensing

Reverse pipetting is a technique to dispense a measured quantity of liquid by means of air displacement pipette. The technique is mainly recommended for solutions with a high viscosity or a tendency to foam: as it reduces the risk of splashing, foam or bubble formation. Reverse pipetting is more precise in dispensing small volumes of liquids containing proteins and biological solutions compared to forward pipetting, which is mostly used for aqueous solutions, such as buffers, diluted acids or alkalis.

== How it works ==
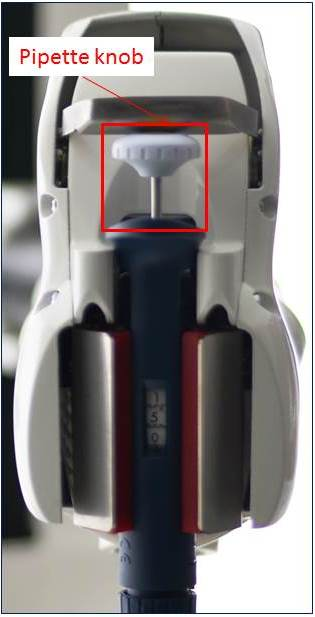
Example of pipette held by robotic hand

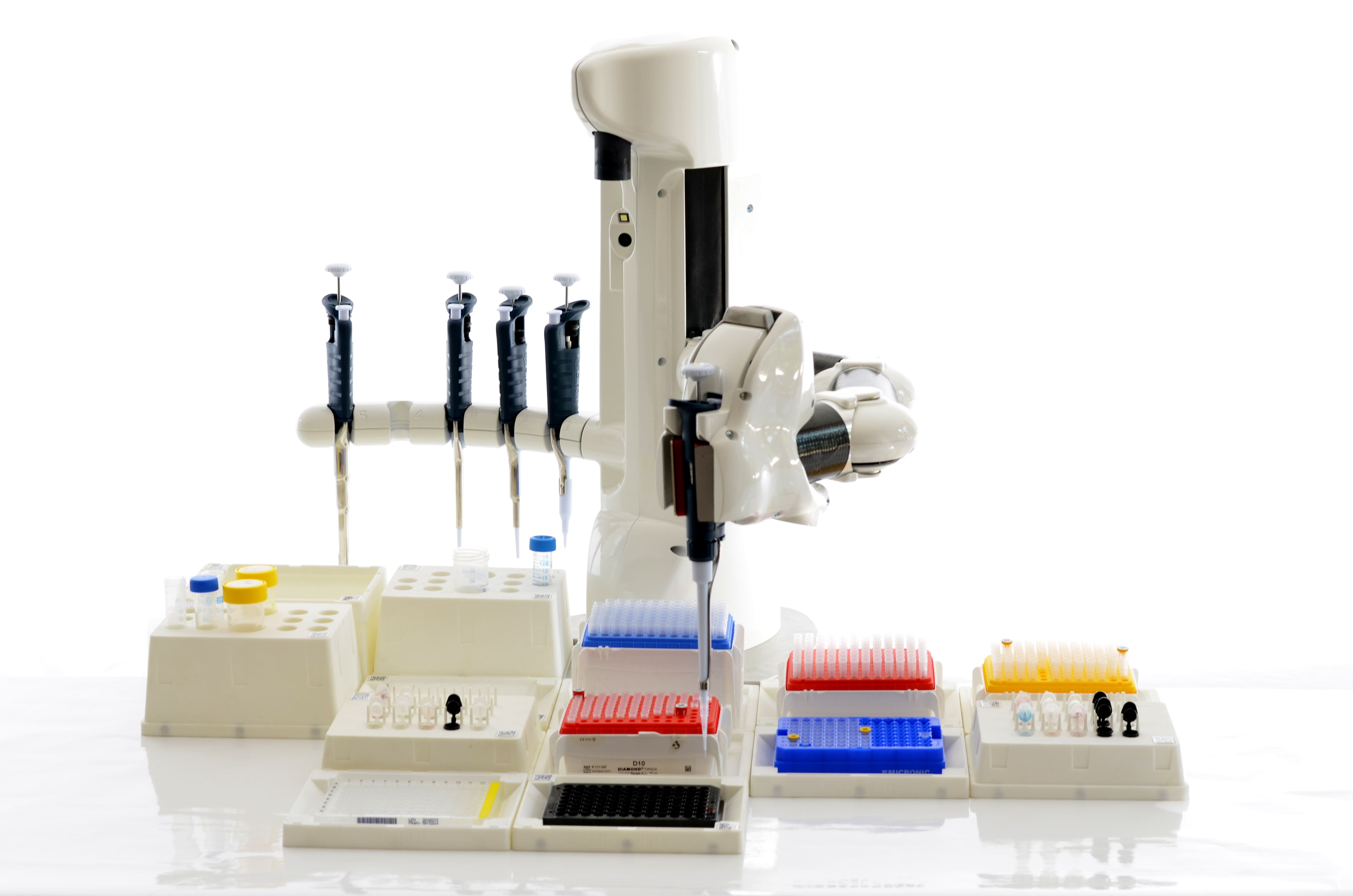
Liquid handling robot capable of reverse pipetting by means of manual pipette

In reverse pipetting, the volume aspirated to the tip is bigger than the volume delivered to the receiving vessel. The excess of volume compensates for the liquid that remains as film inside the tip during dispensing. Liquid aspiration is achieved by creating vacuum by means of the vertical travel of a metal or ceramic piston within an airtight sleeve. As the piston moves upward, driven by the depression of the plunger, a vacuum is created in the space left vacant by the piston. Air from the tip rises to fill the space left vacant, and the tip air is then replaced by the liquid, which is drawn up into the tip and thus available for transport and dispensing elsewhere. When the pipette knob is pressed on an air displacement pipette, the piston inside the instrument moves down to let air out. Air is displaced by the piston. The volume of air displaced is equivalent to the volume of liquid aspirated.
These pipettes are capable of being very precise and accurate. However, since they rely on air displacement, they are subject to inaccuracies caused by the changing environment, particularly temperature and user technique. For these reasons this equipment must be carefully maintained and calibrated, and users must be trained to exercise correct and consistent technique.
Alternative solutions to improve reproducibility and accuracy of manual pipetting operations are based on anthropomorphic liquid handling robots capable to handle air displacement pipettes.

== Technique ==
=== Reverse pipetting with manual pipettes ===
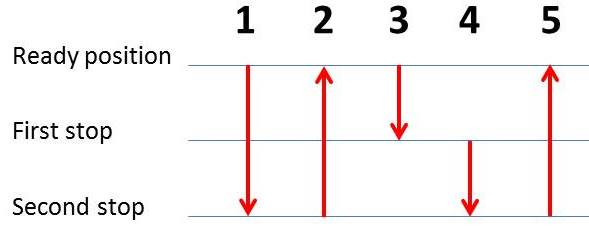
1. Once a suitable tip is attached to the pipette, press its knob to the second stop (#1). Dip the tip into the solution to a certain depth according to the volume set.
2. Afterwards slowly release the pipette knob till the starting position (#2). Withdraw the tip from the liquid.
3. Move the pipette to the receiving vessel and dispense the liquid by gently pressing the pipette knob to the first stop (#3). Withdraw the tip from the liquid. Some liquid will remain inside the tip.
4. The liquid remaining in the tip can be dispensed back into the original solution (#4) or thrown away.
5. Release the pipette thumb to the ready position (#5).

=== Reverse pipetting with electronic pipettes ===
Some electronic pipettes have a mode for reverse pipetting which allows to set the following parameters:

1. Desired volume
2. Excess volume (about 3-5 % of the nominal volume of the pipette)
3. Specify whether the excess volume should be discarded or included in the next aspiration
4. Aspiration speed
5. Dispense speed

== Sources ==
- Guide to pipetting
- Good laboratory pipetting guide
- Thermo Scientific Pipetting Guide
- Wikilectures
- Pipetting Viscous Solutions
- Tips for Proper Pipetting
- How to pipette correctly - 10 tips

== See also ==
- Automated pipetting system
- Liquid Handling Robot
- Pipette
- Air displacement pipette
- Forward pipetting
