= Positive displacement =

Positive displacement may refer to:

- Positive displacement pump
- Positive displacement meter
- Positive displacement pipette
