= Scientific instrument =

Device or tool used for scientific purposes

A scientific instrument is a device or tool used for scientific purposes, including the study of both natural phenomena and theoretical research.

== History ==
Historically, the definition of a scientific instrument has varied, based on usage, laws, and historical time period. Before the mid-nineteenth century such tools were referred to as "natural philosophical" or "philosophical" apparatus and instruments, and older tools from antiquity to the Middle Ages (such as the astrolabe and pendulum clock) defy a more modern definition of "a tool developed to investigate nature qualitatively or quantitatively." Scientific instruments were made by instrument makers living near a center of learning or research, such as a university or research laboratory. Instrument makers designed, constructed, and refined instruments for specific purposes, but if demand was sufficient, an instrument would go into production as a commercial product.

In a description of the use of the eudiometer by Jan Ingenhousz to show photosynthesis, a biographer observed, "The history of the use and evolution of this instrument helps to show that science is not just a theoretical endeavor but equally an activity grounded on an instrumental basis, which is a cocktail of instruments and techniques wrapped in a social setting within a community of practitioners. The eudiometer has been shown to be one of the elements in this mix that kept a whole community of researchers together, even while they were at odds about the significance and the proper use of the thing."

By World War II, the demand for improved analyses of wartime products such as medicines, fuels, and weaponized agents pushed instrumentation to new heights. Today, changes to instruments used in scientific endeavors—particularly analytical instruments—are occurring rapidly, with interconnections to computers and data management systems becoming increasingly necessary.

== Scope ==
Scientific instruments vary greatly in size, shape, purpose, complication and complexity. They include relatively simple laboratory equipment like scales, rulers, chronometers, thermometers, etc. Other simple tools developed in the late 20th century or early 21st century are the Foldscope (an optical microscope), the SCALE (KAS Periodic Table), the MasSpec Pen (a pen that detects cancer), the glucose meter, etc. However, some scientific instruments can be quite large in size and significant in complexity, like particle colliders or radio-telescope antennas. Conversely, microscale and nanoscale technologies are advancing to the point where instrument sizes are shifting towards the tiny, including nanoscale surgical instruments, biological nanobots, and bioelectronics.

== The digital era ==
Instruments are increasingly based upon integration with computers to improve and simplify control; enhance and extend instrumental functions, conditions, and parameter adjustments; and streamline data sampling, collection, resolution, analysis (both during and post-process), and storage and retrieval. Advanced instruments can be connected as a local area network (LAN) directly or via middleware and can be further integrated as part of an information management application such as a laboratory information management system (LIMS). Instrument connectivity can be furthered even more using internet of things (IoT) technologies, allowing for example laboratories separated by great distances to connect their instruments to a network that can be monitored from a workstation or mobile device elsewhere.

== Examples of scientific instruments ==
- Accelerometer, physical, acceleration
- Ammeter, electrical, amperage, current
- Anemometer, wind speed
- Borescope, visual inspection
- Caliper, distance
- Calorimeter, heat
- DNA sequencer, molecular biology
- Dynamometer, torque/force
- Electrometer, electric charge, potential difference
- Electroscope, electric charge
- Electrostatic analyzer, kinetic energy of charged particles
- Ellipsometer, optical refractive indices
- Eudiometer, gas volume
- Gravimeter, gravity
- Hydrometer
- Inclinometer, slope
- Interferometer, optics, infrared light spectra
- Magnetic tweezers, biomolecular manipulation
- Magnetograph, magnetic field
- Magnetometer, magnetic flux
- Manometer, air pressure
- Mass spectrometer, compound identification/characterization
- Micrometer, distance
- Microscope, optical magnification
- NMR spectrometer, chemical compound identification, medical diagnostic imaging
- Ohmmeter, electrical resistance/impedance
- Optical tweezers, nanoscale manipulation
- Oscilloscope, electric signal voltage, amplitude, wavelength, frequency, waveform shape/pattern
- Photometer, illuminance, irradiance, light absorption, scattering of light, reflection of light, fluorescence, phosphorescence, luminescence
- Seismometer, acceleration
- Spectrogram, sound frequency, wavelength, amplitude
- Spectrometer, light frequency, wavelength, amplitude
- Telescope, light magnification (astronomy)
- Thermometer, temperature measurement
- Theodolite, angles, surveying
- Thermocouple, temperature
- Voltmeter, voltage
- X-ray scattering techniques, structural characterization at the nano and atomic scale

== List of scientific instruments manufacturers ==
- 454 Life Sciences, United States of America
- ADInstruments, New Zealand
- Agilent Technologies, United States of America
- Anton Paar, Austria
- A. Reyrolle & Company
- Beckman Coulter, United States of America
- Bruker, United States of America
- Cambridge Scientific Instrument Company, United Kingdom
- Elementar, Germany
- First Light Imaging, France
- Horiba, Japan
- JEOL, Japan
- LECO Corporation, United States of America
- Markes International, United Kingdom
- Malvern Instruments, United Kingdom
- McPherson Inc, United States of America
- Metrohm, Switzerland
- Mettler Toledo, Switzerland / United States of America
- MTS Systems Corporation, US, mechanical
- Novacam Technologies, Canada
- Oxford Instruments, United Kingdom
- Pall Corp., United States of America
- PerkinElmer, United States of America
- Polymer Char, Spain
- Shimadzu Corp., Japan
- Techtron, Melbourne, Australia
- Thermo Fisher Scientific, United States of America
- Waters Corporation, United States of America
- Xenocs, France

== List of scientific instruments designers ==
- Jones, William
- Kipp, Petrus Jacobus
- Le Bon, Gustave
- Roelofs, Arjen
- Schöner, Johannes
- Von Reichenbach, Georg Friedrich

== History of scientific instruments ==
=== Museums ===
- Collection of Historical Scientific Instruments (CHSI)
- Boerhaave Museum
- Chemical Heritage Foundation
- Deutsches Museum
- Royal Victoria Gallery for the Encouragement of Practical Science
- Whipple Museum of the History of Science

=== Historiography ===
- Paul Bunge Prize

== Types of scientific instruments ==
- Optical instrument
- Electronic test equipment

== See also ==
- Instrumentation
- Instrumentalism, a philosophic theory
- List of collectibles
