= McPherson Inc =

Company logo

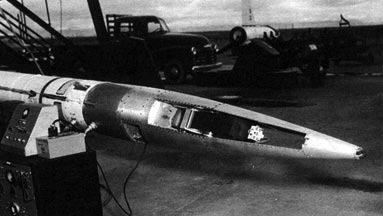
McPherson monochromator in nose cone of rocket for exto-atmospheric, vacuum ultraviolet solar spectroscopy. Circa 1953.

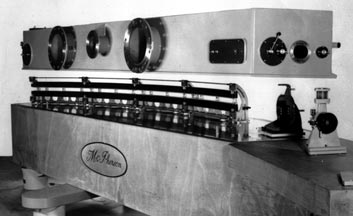
McPherson 35-foot (11 m) focal length (10.6 m) grazing incidence spectrometer delivered in 1965/66 to the National Institute of Standards and Technology. The instrument remains in use today.

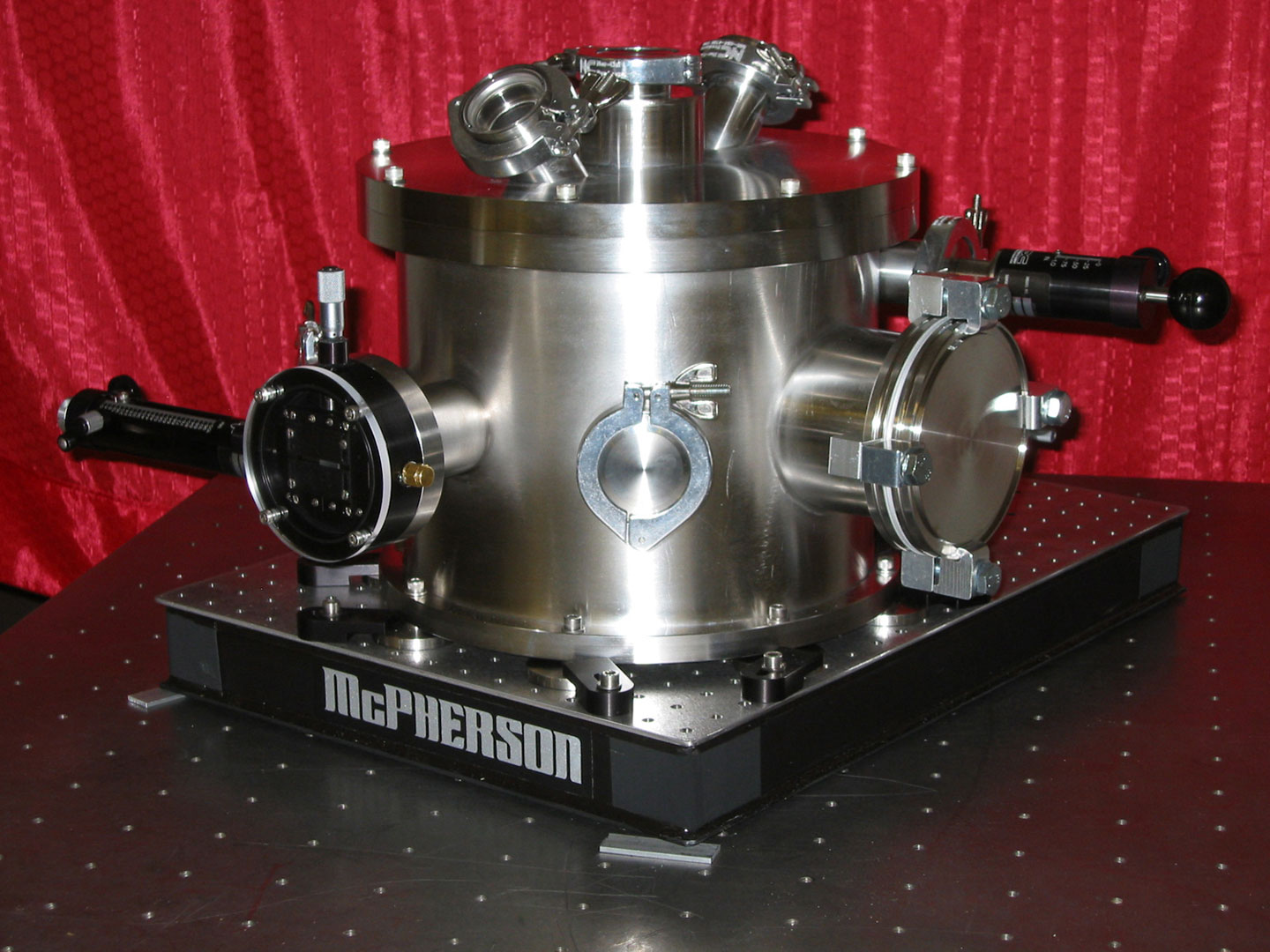
McPherson soft X-ray, extreme ultraviolet flat field grazing incidence spectrograph.

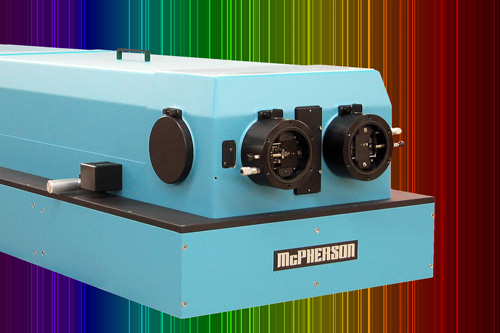
McPherson 4m focal length high resolution spectrometer shown over example of false color Xenon spectrum.

McPherson is a custom manufacturer of precision optical instruments and systems for measuring and characterizing spectra. McPherson instruments measure intensity vs. frequency in various regions of the electromagnetic spectrum. McPherson’s spectral test instruments are based on the dispersing properties of a diffraction grating and/or refractive prism.

McPherson specializes in vacuum fabrication, ultraviolet optical systems, spectroscopic techniques, and high-resolution spectral tests and measurement instrumentation. End-user and OEM applications include research, metrology, semiconductors, pharmaceuticals, nanotechnology, aerospace, and defense.

== History ==
McPherson began manufacturing spectral test instrumentation in 1952^{1}. The company's first spectral test instruments were rocket-born spectrometers used outside the Earth’s atmosphere to study the vacuum ultraviolet portion of the solar spectrum.

Today, McPherson instruments are employed in laboratory environments around the world, for spectroscopic analysis in the infrared, visible, vacuum ultraviolet, and soft X-ray regions.

=== Company ownership ===
The Company was founded as McPherson Instrument Corporation by Paul McPherson (1920 - 1972) and operated as a sole proprietorship^{2} until 1967 when it was sold to the now defunct GCA Corporation. It was operated as GCA/McPherson, a division of GCA Corporation, until 1981 when it was sold to D. M. Schoeffel. It has operated under various names: McPherson - Division of SI Corporation, McPherson Instruments, SI/McPherson, and McPherson, Inc. Currently, the company is simply called McPherson and remains a privately held company. It is headquartered in Chelmsford, Massachusetts USA.

=== Patents ===
Many McPherson instrument and system designs have been awarded US patents. Some of these include:

- Monochromator Adapted for use in the Ultraviolet Region (US Patent No. 3,090,863)^{3} This Auto-focusing Normal Incidence instrument is designed for use in the extreme ultraviolet and vacuum ultraviolet region (30 to 200 nm.) It has been modernized and is still in production.
- Ultraviolet Monochromator (US Patent No. 3,211,049)^{3} This grazing incidence Rowland circle instrument is designed for use in the soft X-ray and extreme ultraviolet spectral region (1 to 30 nm.) It has been modernized and is still in production.
- Optical Grating Spectral Dispersion System (US Patent No. 3,409,374^{3} This criss-cross Czerny Turner optical system is capable of operation from about 105 nm to 10 micrometers in the infrared and features (patented) interchangeable gratings and a vacuum tight housing. This is a modern instrument and remains in constant production to fill a high demand.

Additional patents (3,026,435) (3,161,769) (3,490,848) (3,433,557)^{3} for easily exchangeable optics, ultraviolet light sources, and detectors have also been granted to McPherson.

McPherson instruments are employed in universities, research laboratories, and corporate research and development groups around the world, including: 3M Corporation (USA), Aarhus University (Denmark), Brookhaven National Laboratory (USA), Caltech (USA), Daresbury Laboratory (UK), Ecole Polytechnique (Switzerland), Food and Drug Administration (USA), General Electric (USA), Hasylab (Germany), IBM (USA), Joint European Torus (UK), KAIST (Korea), Los Alamos National Laboratory (USA), Massachusetts Institute of Technology (USA), National Institute of Standards and Technology (USA), etc.

== See also ==
- Spectroscopy
- Laboratory equipment
- Raman spectroscopy
- Infrared spectroscopy
- Spectrometer
- Monochromator
- Optics
- Spectrophotometry
- Optical instrument
- Scientific instrument
