= Henry A. Lardy =

Professor of biochemistry (1917–2010)

- Born: August 19, 1917; Roslyn, South Dakota, U.S.
- Died: August 4, 2010 (aged 92); Madison, Wisconsin
- Education: South Dakota State University (B.S.); University of Wisconsin-Madison (M.S., Ph.D.)
- Known for: Metabolic pathways, enzyme kinetics
- Awards: Wolf Foundation Award in Agriculture, National Award of Agricultural Excellence
- Scientific career
- Fields: Biochemistry
- Workplaces: University of Wisconsin-Madison
- Doctoral advisor: Paul H. Phillips
- Notable students: Post-docs: William J. Rutter

Henry A. Lardy NAS AAA&S APS (August 19, 1917 – August 4, 2010) was a biochemist and professor emeritus in the biochemistry department at the University of Wisconsin-Madison. He was elected to the National Academy of Sciences in 1958, the American Academy of Arts and Sciences in 1965, and the American Philosophical Society in 1976. Research in Lardy's laboratory centered on elucidating the mechanisms underlying metabolism.

== Biography ==
=== Early life and education ===
Professor Lardy was born in Roslyn, South Dakota in 1917. He earned his bachelor's degree in 1939 from South Dakota State University, with a double major in chemistry and dairy science. While at South Dakota State, Henry Lardy worked in the dairy science department, where he cared for rats and cows that were used for Vitamin D research.

Henry Lardy earned both his master's (1940) and Ph.D. (1945) degrees from the University of Wisconsin-Madison.

=== Career ===
After earning his Ph.D., Dr. Lardy joined the faculty at the Enzyme Institute at UW-Madison, and very quickly became the institute's team lead. His laboratory has published more than 370 articles on a variety of metabolic phenomena. Even after his official retirement, Prof. Lardy still operated a laboratory in the biochemistry department.

== Notable scientific contributions ==
Prof. Lardy is among several people credited for the development of adjustable micropipets. He also played an important role in developing methods for the storage and preservation of semen, which aided in artificial insemination of livestock. He also coined the term cytosol, which refers to the aqueous fluid inside cells.

== Awards and distinctions ==
- 1949 - Paul-Lewis Award in Enzyme Chemistry (American Chemical Society)
- 1981 - Wolf Prize in Agriculture
- 1982 - National Award of Agricultural Excellence
- 1988 - William C. Rose Award (American Society for Biochemistry and Molecular Biology)

== Death ==
Lardy died of prostate cancer on August 4, 2010. Ironically, one of his research projects involved an anti-prostate cancer compound, which he had been working on even before his diagnosis.
