= Arjen Roelofs =

Dutch astronomer

Arjen Roelofs (1 March 1754 – 11 May 1828) was a Dutch astronomer.

== Early life ==
Roelofs was born on the Hommema-sate (estate) near Hijum in Friesland, the youngest of four sons and two daughters. His father was Roelof Pytters, a tenant farmer and tax receiver. His mother was Neeltje Alberts from Finkum. The oldest son Klaas trained as a steersman, but did not work as one, and instead became a doctor in Sexbierum. The other sister Lisbeth married and left the household. It was not an easy life on the farm, but this is where the other three boys, Pieter, Albert and Arjen worked. Their mother stimulated the interest of the three sons in mathematics and science, however their father was unhappy with this.

After their parents died in 1790, the three brothers took over the farm, and their sister Antje became their housekeeper. None of these four ever married, and they all lived on the farm until they died. Arjen Roelofs was supposed to have polio so he could not use his right leg very well, and later he could not work on the farm anymore. This enabled him to spend more time on his hobbies. His brothers joined him in his hobbies. Pieter was known as a mathematician, and was also an excellent instrument maker. Arjen designed telescopes, and Pieter made them. Albert was a clockmaker. Pieter and Arjen took meteorological measurements and made instruments to accomplish this. They made thermometers, hygrometers, and measured wind speed and wind direction.

== Circle of friends ==
Eise Eisinga regularly spent time at Hijum. He ensured that University of Franeker professor Jean Henri van Swinden became a very regular visitor. Roelofs also took on students. His cousin Roel Hessels Hommema, and his friend Rinse Bearts Gelder were taught in Hijum. Later Arjen regularly worked with instrument maker and farmer Sieds Johannes Rienks of Hallum.

In 1817 they presented a plan for the construction of a telescope to the Dutch Government. The plan did not eventuate. However it did interest King Willem I, who named both as Brothers in the Order of the Netherlands Lion on 23 September 1817. The brothers were also awarded a silver medal by Lodewijk Napoleon, on 20 June 1810. Arjen Roelofs made most of the calculations and measurements for Rienks for the building of the telescopes in Leiden and Utrecht. Rienks had been commissioned to build these in 1818. The duo had a falling out during this project, and the quality of the telescopes suffered. The Leiden telescope, finished in 1821 had a diameter of 24 inches and a length of forty feet. It was so bad that it was sold as scrap in 1845.

The telescope for Utrecht was never installed. Roelofs also calculated the times of solar eclipses for Rienks. During the eclipse of 7 September 1820 there were quite a number of people on the farm with Roelofs. His brothers already died some time before. Pieter died in 1801, and Albert in 1809. The governor of Friesland, Idsert Aebinga van Humalda was present. Professors and their work associates from Franeker were there and also Eisinga.

Arjen Roelofs observed four transits of Mercury. For three of these he made accurate predictions of the start and end times. His observations did not correspond to the orbital elements that were known at the time. If he had made this better known, a more accurate orbit for Mercury could have been calculated. Arjen Roelofs was too modest.

== Different projects ==
Arjen Roelofs was also busy with other activities. He developed lightning conductors, and better sea dikes. Farm houses were often struck by lightning. Roelofs studied this by using a kite. He invented a lightning rod. He employed Rienks to make them, and sold them for 30 guilders each.

After the flood disaster of 1825, Roelofs worked on dikes. He studied them to see if they could be improved. Roelofs made a proposal to the provincial government to build the dikes differently. Before this the sides of the dikes were steep and protected by wooden posts. These poles had been eaten by shipworm. Roelofs proposed to get rid of the wooden posts, and to have the faces of the dikes more moderately sloped and covered with a sturdy layer of earth. Willem Loré had already thought of this, and it is not known if Roelofs was aware of Loré's ideas.

== Death ==
The farmer professor died in Hijum at the age of 74 years, after a long illness. He was buried next to his brothers and sister at the grave yard at Hijum. The road from Oude Leije that passes the location of Hommema-sate was renamed Arjen Roelswei. Also the school at Hijum is named after him.

== Manuscripts ==
Roelofs could have done better than what he did. His problem was that he was too much of an individualist. He did not use tables, but would rather calculate everything himself. He also limited himself by being happy to stay in Hijum. He must have written quite a bit by necessity, but he did not ever publish. In 1829 a booklet titled Levensberigten van Arjen Roelofs (Life of Arjen Roelofs) was published by a farmer acquaintance Worp van Peyma from Ternaard. He was able to read Roelofs's hand written notes. Most of these have since been lost. The Eisinga Planetarium has a telescope made by Roelofs, and some of his manuscripts. Also the Tresoar in Leeuwarden has a small collection of manuscripts.

Arjen had a motto he repeatedly used: "never let a day go by without having done something good".

== Extra reading ==
- Nieuwenhuis, H (1988), "Aarjen Roeloffs een vergeten genie", Zenit, 15 Jaarg (10): 339–340
- W Van Peyma (1839). Levensberichten van Arjen Roelofs Roelofs, in leven broeder der orde van den Nederlandschen Leeuw, en landbouwer te Hyum. Franeker.
