= Polymer Char =

Spanish manufacturing company

Polymer Characterization, S.A.
- Company type: Private Company
- Industry: Analytical Instrumentation for Polymer characterization
- Founded: 1992; 34 years ago
- Founder: B. Monrabal
- Headquarters: Valencia, Spain
- Area served: North America; South America; Europe; Africa; Asia
- Products: Gel permeation chromatography / Size Exclusion Chromatography; Chemical composition Distribution; Xylene Solubles; Bivariate distribution Preparative Fractionation; Infrared Detectors
- Services: Analytical Services; Laboratory Consulting
- Website: polymerchar.com

Polymer Char is a company which designs and manufactures instrumentation for polymer analysis.

== History ==
Polymer Char was founded by B. Monrabal in 1992 in the Valencia Technology Park, in Spain, being registered with the name of Polymer Characterization, S.A.

Its initial goal was to develop a commercial Crystallization Analysis Fractionation (CRYSTAF) instrument based on technology developed by Monrabal at Dow Chemical Company laboratories in the Netherlands to measure chemical composition distribution in semicrystalline polymers.

A CRYSTAF prototype was presented at Pittcon in 1994. The first product was acquired in 1995 by a petrochemical company in South Korea.

The company has also developed techniques and instruments for polymer characterization, and more specifically, for polyolefin (polyethylene and polypropylene) characterization.

Polymer Char's technology is present in the petrochemical and research and development industries in over 20 countries in North America, South America, Europe, Africa, and Asia.

== Analytical instrumentation ==
The company develops analytical instruments for polymer analysis.

Chemical composition distribution

Chemical composition distribution (CCD) together with the molar mass distribution (MMD) and their interdependence define the microstructure of a polyolefin. CCD is often the most discriminating feature of a complex polyolefin. Some instruments in Polymer Char's range are available for this purpose:

- Crystallization analysis fractionation (CRYSTAF): instrument intended for the fast measurement of the chemical composition distribution (CCD) in polyolefins (crystallization analysis fractionation).
- Temperature rising elution fractionation (TREF): for the characterization of CCD in polyolefins.
- Crystallization elution fractionation (CEF): high-throughput chemical composition distribution analyzer by CEF
- TGIC: technique for the analysis of low crystallinity polyolefins implemented by a fully automated instrument.

Molar mass distribution

- GPC-IR: high temperature gel permeation chromatography (GPC) for polyolefin molar mass distribution. It works with concentration and composition detectors (infrared), viscometer and light scattering.
- GPC One: GPC calculations software.
- Data Unit 200: signals device for gel permeation chromatography instruments.
- GPC-QC: simplified and fully automated GPC instrument aimed at control laboratories in polyolefin production plants.

Intrinsic viscosity

- IVA: automated instrument for intrinsic viscosity analysis of polymers with dissolution temperature up to 200 °C.

Bivariate distribution

- Cross-fractionation chromatography(CFC) instrument to analyze the polyolefin bivariate distribution by TREF and gel permeation chromatography.
- SGIC 2D: 3D results with the advantages of using an IR detector for this new tool aimed at polyolefin characterization.

Preparative fractionation

- PREP mc2: preparative instrument to fractionate polymers by molar mass or composition (TREF or CRYSTAF).
- PREP C20: a column-based preparative fractionation instrument, capable to fractionate up to 20 grams of polymer.

Soluble fraction

- CRYSTEX: instrument intended to measure the amorphous fraction of polypropylene and ethylene-propylene copolymers, for quality control laboratories for polypropylene manufacturing plants.
- CRYSTEX QC: fully automated instrument for amorphous phase determination in PP/EP manufacturing QC laboratories.
- CRYSTEX 42: high-throughput system for simultaneous measurement of the soluble fraction, ethylene content and intrinsic viscosity in a fully automated process for up to 42 samples.

Infrared detectors

- IR4: Infrared detector for composition and concentration measurements in polyolefins for gel permeation chromatography (GPC/SEC), HPLC, TREF, etc.
- IR5: an infrared detector for highly demanding applications in Polymer Char instruments such as GPC-IR, HPLC, CFC and other separation techniques.

Part of the techniques and instruments were developed with Petrochemical companies and Research Institutes from United States, Belgium, Finland, Germany and Japan. The company supplies in over 35 countries around the globe Analytical Services for Polymer characterization.

== See also ==
- Polymer characterization
- Polyolefin
- Gel permeation chromatography / Size Exclusion Chromatography
- Polymer science
- Polymer Chemistry
- Chromatography
