= William Jones (optician) =

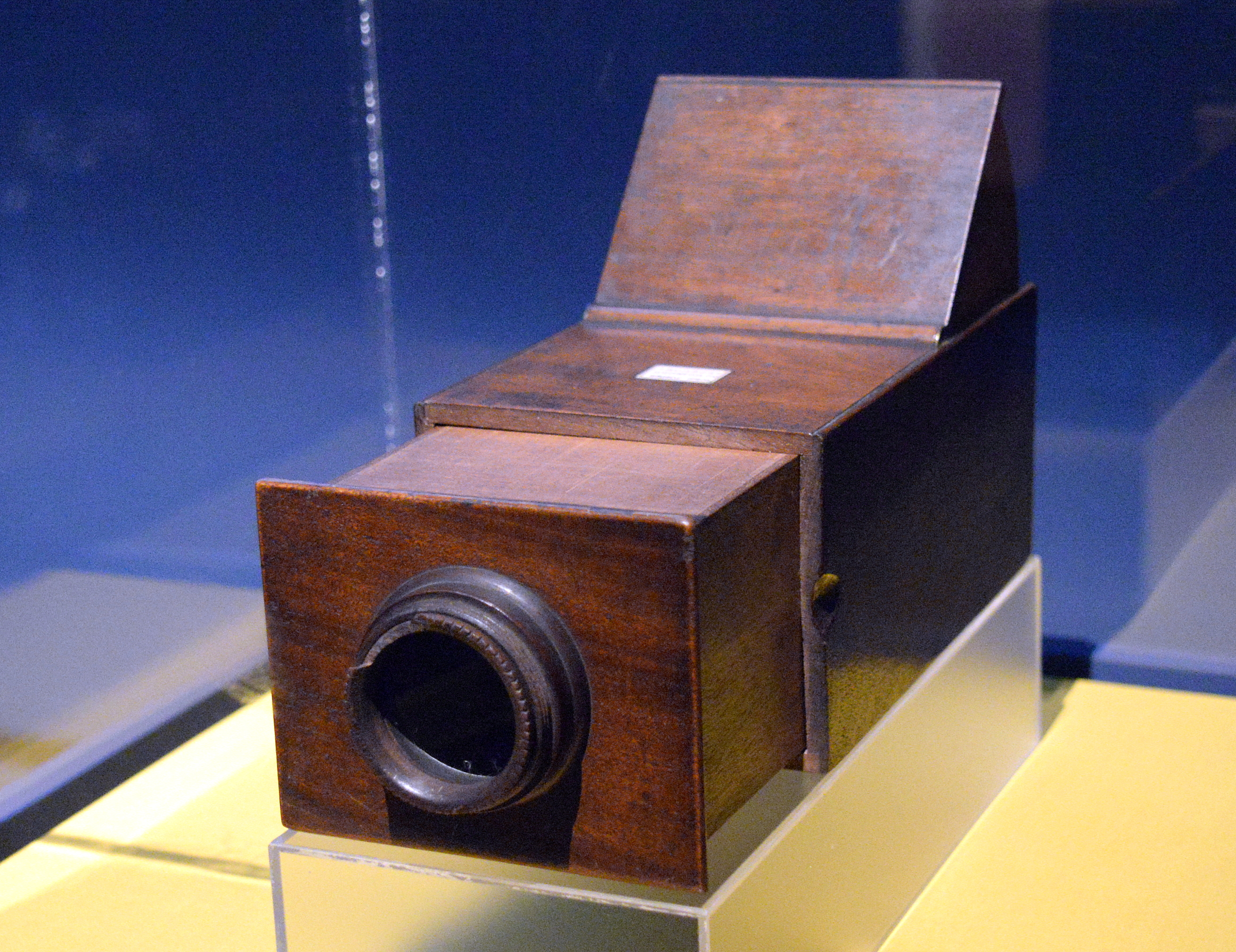
Portable box camera Obscura, W&S Jones, London, UK, 1800–1820. National Museum of Scotland, Edinburgh

William Jones (1762–1831) was an English maker of optical and other scientific instruments, who had Thomas Jefferson among his customers in London. He later formed a partnership with his younger brother Samuel Jones. W. & S. Jones were among the most successful scientific instrument makers in London during the late 18th and early 19th centuries. In 1797, Jones introduced the box sextant or 'pocket sextant' for nautical navigation, an early marvel of mechanical miniaturisation.

W. & S. Jones published The Description and Use of a New Portable Orrery to promote their instruments and to describe their use. They worked at 135 Holborn from 1792 to 1800, and at 30 Holborn from 1800 to 1860.
