= Positive displacement pipette =

Positive displacement pipettes are a type of pipette that operates via piston-driven displacement. Unlike an air displacement pipette, which dispenses liquid using an air cushion in the pipette tip, the piston in a positive displacement pipette makes direct contact with the sample, allowing the aspiration force to remain constant.

== Applications ==
Since the piston makes direct contact with the sample, the aspiration force in a positive displacement pipette is unaffected by the sample's physical properties. Several liquid handling companies suggest that positive displacement pipettes can be used to accurately pipette very viscous, volatile, hot or cold, or corrosive samples.

=== Viscous liquids ===
Viscous liquids, such as glycerol, flow very slowly. Glycerol has high dynamic viscosity, and if a researcher aspirates a sample of glycerol too quickly with an air displacement pipette, It will draw up an air bubble. When a researcher attempts to dispense the liquid, some of it will stick to the pipette tip wall, dispense very slowly and remain in the tip. Surfactants also produce this effect, but the remaining liquid film is thinner. In a positive displacement pipette, the aspiration strength remains constant, so the tip fills evenly. Also, the piston slides along the internal sides of the pipette tip and pushes the total volume out, so no liquid is left behind.

=== Volatile liquids ===
Volatile liquids such as acetone, hexane, and methanol, evaporate continuously in air displacement pipettes. Some volatile liquids expand so quickly that they expand the air column in the pipette, which causes leakage: The pipette will lose drops and dispense liquid imprecisely. As drops leak out, they can contaminate the bench, ultimately causing cross-contamination from sample to sample. These drops can also produce a health hazard.

Because there is no air cushion in a positive displacement pipette, liquids do not evaporate or leak. Drops will not fall from the tip, and vapors will not contaminate the internal parts of the pipette. Also, the capillary/piston (CP) tips used for positive displacement pipetting are disposable.

=== Hot or cold liquids ===
In an air displacement pipette, the ambient temperature is correlated with the volume of the air cushion and affects the aspiration volume. Cold liquids, such as a suspension of restriction enzymes, which are usually handled at 0°C, cause the air cushion to shrink and the pipette to aspirate more liquid than expected, making the pipette over-deliver. Hot samples, such as mammalian cell cultures at body temperature or polymerase chain reaction solutions at 60°C or higher, will cause the air cushion to expand, causing the pipette to aspirate less liquid than expected and making the pipette under-deliver.

Positive displacement pipettes do not have an air cushion and are less affected by liquid temperature, yielding greater pipetting accuracy.

=== Corrosive and hazardous liquids ===
Corrosive and radioactive liquids may damage the piston, seal, and tip holder in an air displacement pipette. Positive displacement pipettes use a disposable capillary/piston (CP) tip, so the pipette is not affected by corrosive samples over its lifetime. Since there is no contact between the sample and the pipette, there is little risk of contamination.

== Pipetting technique ==
Positive displacement pipettes operate very similarly to air displacement pipettes.

Steps for operating a positive displacement pipette

1. Set the pipetting volume.
2. Attach a CP tip onto the pipette.
3. Hold the pipette vertically and press the plunger to the first stop.
4. Put the CP tip into the sample and slowly release it, moving the button to the home position.
5. Press the plunger to the first stop again to dispense the sample.
6. Press the plunger to the second stop to eject the CP tip.
