= Techtron =

Techtron.
- Industry: Scientific instruments
- Founded: 1938
- Headquarters: Melbourne, Australia
- Key people: Mr Geoffrey S.V. Frew, Founder; Alan Walsh, Inventor of AAS
- Products: Electronic Equipment, Scientific instruments
- Parent: Merged with Varian Inc. 1967

Techtron Appliances was an Australian electronics manufacturer established in 1938 by Mr Geoffrey S.V. Frew. It manufactured electronic equipment to order in North Melbourne, Australia. The name was derived from the words 'Technical' and 'Electronic'.

== History ==
After the second world war, Mr Frew manufactured a range of scientific equipment from his home in Brighton.

In 1954, Techtron moved to small cottages in Market St. South Melbourne, and in 1957, won a tender to build electronics modules for Atomic Absorption Spectrophotometers (AAS) to CSIRO specifications. Mr Frew worked closely with Alan Walsh, the originator and developer of the atomic absorption method of chemical analysis.

By 1962 Techtron had supplied about of these 40 kits, and took a manufacturing license from CSIRO to manufacture complete AAS instruments using imported Carl Zeiss AG monochromators, with electronics and other components made locally.

In 1964 Techtron produced the first all-Australian AA instrument, the Techtron AA3, and presented it at the 1964 Pittsburgh Conference in the United States of America.

In August 1965, Techtron Appliances Pty Ltd merged with Atomic Spectral Lamps Pty Ltd to form Techtron Pty Ltd

1967 – Continued growth forced a move to Springvale Rd, Mulgrave, Australia. In October 1967, Techtron Pty Ltd merged with Varian Associates, an American company based at Palo Alto, California. This merger brought great strengths to Techtron in the way of manufacturing techniques, financial support, and perhaps most importantly, a worldwide distribution network for its products. The company now became known as Varian Techtron Pty. Limited.

In 1970, Geoffrey Frew donated a substantial sum to the Australian Academy of Science 'in recognition of the successful commercial development of atomic absorption spectrochemical analysis, which had been originated by Dr A. Walsh of the CSIRO Division of Chemical Physics in 1954'. The Geoffrey Frew Fellowships enable distinguished scientists from abroad to travel to Australia to participate in the Australian Spectroscopy Conferences and to visit scientific centres around the country. Recipients have included Nobel Laureates A.L. Schawlow, G. Porter, G. Herzberg, C. Cohen-Tannoudji and J. Polanyi.

In 1971 the company developed a range of UV-Visible spectrophotometers which complemented its range of AA instruments and allowed the company access into a new market segment. A totally new micro-computerised range of these UV-Visible instruments was given a worldwide release in the United States in March 1980

A major tribute was paid to Varian Techtron in 1982 with the decision by Varian Associates to transfer the complete Cary UV-Visible product line down to Australia. Cary had long been known as the 'Rolls-Royce' of UV-Visible spectrophotometers and now the total responsibility for the manufacture, marketing and future development of these products lay with the Australian company.

In 1990 some 450 people were employed at the Melbourne plant.

1991 – Varian, Inc. was formed to take over the scientific instruments, vacuum products and electronics manufacturing businesses of Varian Associates, Inc. Varian Australia Pty Ltd became a subsidiary of Varian, Inc.

2009 - In November 2009 Agilent Technologies Inc. acquire Varian, Inc. for US$1.5 billion. The Mulgrave site continues to be profitable and grows slightly as they absorb the Agilent sales staff from the Burwood site. The Agilent Network Testing group (Burwood site) is sold off to LA based company Ixia.
