= Elementar =

- Industry: Instrumentation and regulation technology
- Founded: 1897
- Headquarters: Langenselbold, Hesse, Germany
- Products: Analytical instruments, equipment and consumables, services for research, manufacturing, analysis and diagnostics
- Website: www.elementar.com

Elementar is a German multinational manufacturer of elemental analyzers and isotope ratio mass spectrometers for the analysis of non-metallic elements like carbon, nitrogen, sulphur, hydrogen, oxygen or chlorine. The company emerged from Heraeus, a multinational German engineering company that produced analytical instrumentation. Elemental analyzers and isotope ratio mass spectrometers are used in the fields of analytical and environmental chemistry to measure the elemental and isotopic composition of diverse materials like chemicals, pharmaceuticals, fuels, food, water, plants, soil or waste.

== History ==
=== 1897 – 1945 ===
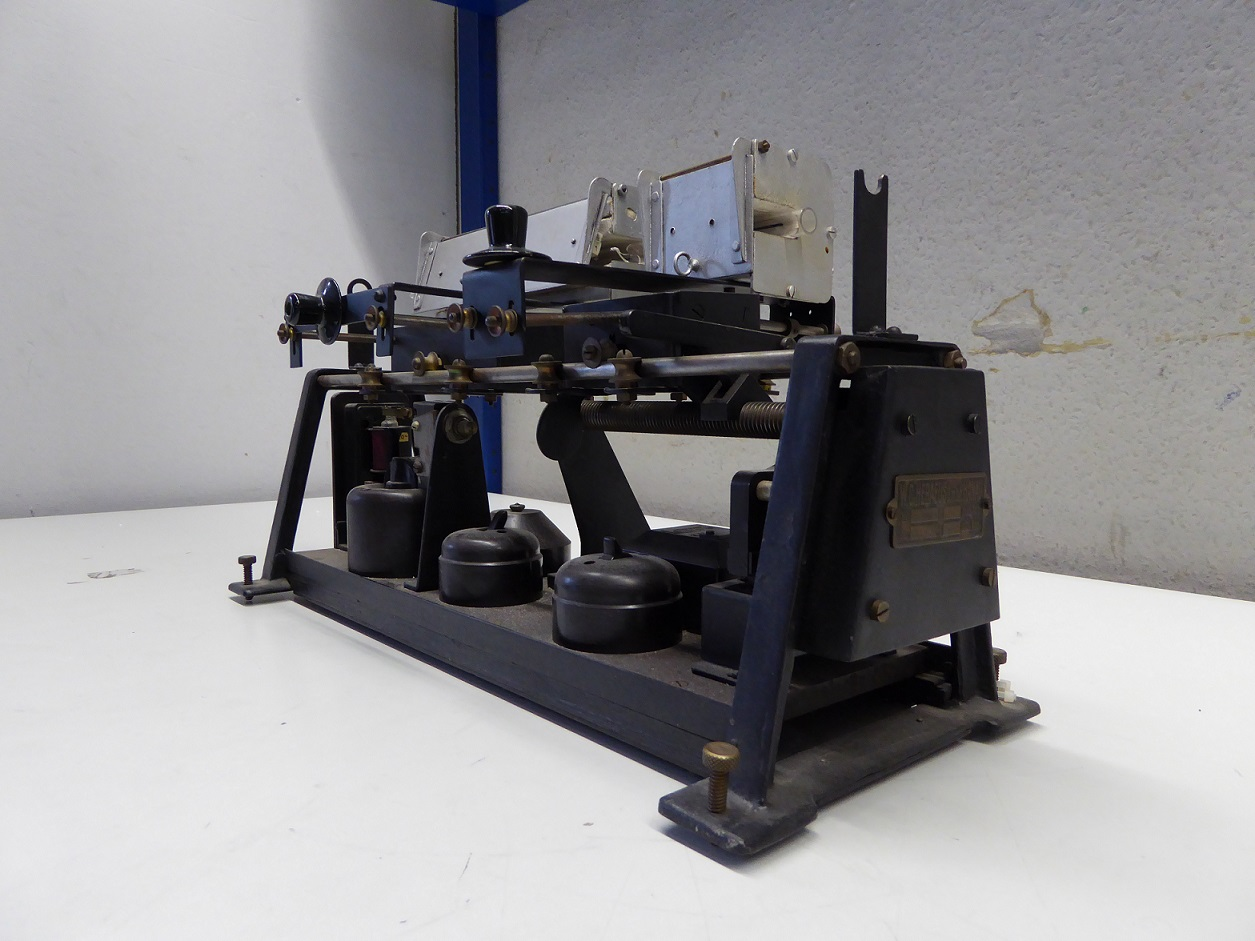
Heraeus historic elemental analyzer, type "CH Analysator", construction year 1932

In 1897, the researcher Max Dennstedt reported a simplified method for organic elemental analysis in his publication Über Vereinfachung der organischen Elementaranalyse, making use of platinum from the Heraeus Platinum Smelting Factory (founded in 1857) as an oxidation catalyst. In 1899, Richard Küch, researcher at the Heraeus Platinum Smelting Factory, succeeded in producing quartz glass of very high purity, which was soon used for the elemental analysis of carbon, and nitrogen. Between 1900 and 1910, Max Dennstedt substantially improved the procedures of elemental analyses, which was the basis for the first generation of elemental analyzers with electrical furnaces produced by Heraeus. In 1923, Fritz Pregl received the Nobel Prize in Chemistry for his invention of the method of micro-analysis of organic substances, using dedicated analytical equipment manufactured by Heraeus. In 1932, the first elemental analyzer for simultaneous detection of carbon, hydrogen and nitrogen was invented. In 1944 and 1945, the town of Hanau, an important German industrial site, as well as Heraeus production facilities, were nearly completely destroyed in Allied bombing raids.

=== Since 1945 ===
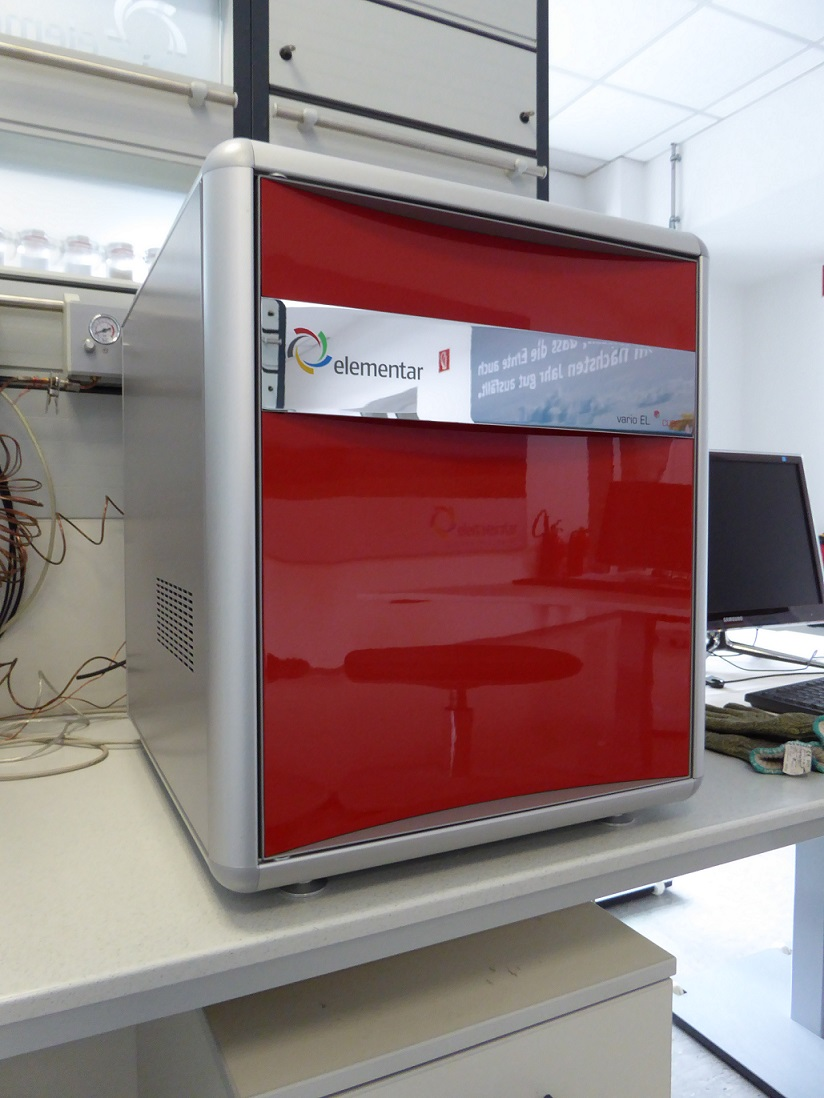
Elementar modern elemental analyzer, type "vario EL cube", construction year 2011

After the Second World War, the company diversified its elemental analysis products, but an extensive reorganization of the Heraeus core business divisions in the early 1990s resulted in plans to discontinue the production of elemental analyzers. In 1995, the elemental analysis business of Heraeus was sold in a management buyout to Hans-Peter Sieper, at that time head of the Heraeus elemental analysis division. Hans-Peter Sieper restructured the business under the brand name Elementar. Under his management, the company grew into a global company group with offices in the U.S., China, France, Italy, Japan, India and Australia, and operations in many other countries. In 2008, Elementar acquired Isoprime Ltd., a company specialised on the construction of isotope ratio mass spectrometers (IRMS), and set the basis for entry into the market of stable isotope ratio analysis. Following a decision in 2016 to consolidate all products under a single identity the IRMS products were re-branded from the beginning of 2017 as Elementar and Isoprime Ltd was renamed Elementar UK Ltd at the same time.

== Corporate structure ==
=== Elementar ===
Elementar is specialized in the development and production of elemental analyzers for the measurement of carbon, nitrogen, sulphur, hydrogen and oxygen for product quality and purity control of food, fuels, chemicals and pharmaceuticals. The production facility is located in Langenselbold, Hesse, Germany.

=== Elementar UK (formerly known as Isoprime) ===
Elementar UK produces isotope ratio mass spectrometers used for stable isotope ratio measurement of carbon, nitrogen, sulphur, hydrogen and oxygen in industry and academia. The production facility is located in Manchester, United Kingdom. In 2013, the company was awarded The Queen's Award for Enterprise: International Trade (Export).

== Customers ==
Elementar supplies instrumentation to manufacturing companies and service providers in the chemical and pharmaceutical industry, the energy sector, food industry and agriculture.
