= The Queen's Award for Enterprise: International Trade (Export) (2013) =

The Queen's Award for Enterprise: International Trade (International Trade Export) (2013) was awarded in 2013, by Queen Elizabeth II.

The following organisations were awarded this year:

== Recipients ==
- Alfred Cheyne Engineering
- Armagard
- Astro Lighting
- Auger Torque Europe
- Benoy
- BlueGnome
- BMT Defence Services
- Bon Bon Buddies
- Campbell Lutyens Holdings
- CFC Underwriting
- Charterhouse Property Management
- CommAgility
- Coombe Castle International
- CRFS
- DB Orthodontics
- Denis Wick Products
- Ealing Hammersmith & West London College
- Easypack
- EIP Partnership
- Elekta
- Elmgrove Foods
- EPTG
- Espiner Medical
- ETL Systems
- Euroforest
- Europlus Direct
- Exploration Partners International
- Fever-Tree
- FIRST Magazine
- Fort Vale Engineering
- G3Baxi Partnership
- Galmarley t/a BullionVault
- Gapuma (UK)
- Global Inkjet Systems
- Griffon Hoverwork
- Hewson Consulting Engineers
- Highclere International Investors
- HotDocs
- HRH
- I Love Cosmetics
- Imparta
- Inca Digital Printers
- Isoprime
- JoBird&Co
- Just Rollers
- Keltic Seafare (Scotland)
- KP Technology
- Limpsfield Combustion Engineering Co
- London & Scandinavian Metallurgical Co
- London School of Business & Finance (UK)
- McLaren Electronic Systems
- Mediplus
- Metal Events
- Metalube
- Metryx
- Mettler-Toledo Safeline X-ray
- ModuSpec Engineering UK
- MW High Tech Projects UK
- Nails Inc
- Nasco (UK)
- Niftylift
- Oil Consultants
- Omex Agrifluids
- Osborn Metals
- Palintest
- Panache Lingerie
- PCME
- Pearson Engineering
- Pentland Group
- Petroleum Experts
- Pipeshield International
- Plant Parts
- Projection Lighting
- Protec Technical
- Proto Labs
- RealVNC
- Regatta
- Reid Lifting
- Renewable Energy Systems Holdings
- Rigibore
- Rinicom
- Royal Society of Chemistry (RSC) Publishing
- Sarkar Defence Solutions
- Seers Medical
- SelectScience
- Shand Engineering
- Sheppee International
- Simpleware
- Smart Voucher t/a Ukash
- Soil Machine Dynamics
- Spencer Feeds
- Speymalt Whisky Distributors t/a Gordon & MacPhail
- SPTS Technologies UK
- SRK Consulting (UK)
- Steelite International
- Stirling Lloyd Polychem
- Structure-flex
- Sun Mark
- Symon Dacon
- TENMAT
- TestPlant
- The Cambridge Satchel Company
- The Innis & Gunn Brewing Company
- The University of Huddersfield (Business School)
- The Wakefield Shirt Company
- Thirty Nine Essex Street Chambers
- Tiffany Rose
- Totalpost Services
- Triveritas
- Tyrrells Potato Crisps
- W Durston
- Weir Minerals Europe
- Whetman Pinks
- Winn & Coales International
- Winsted
- Wood & Douglas
- Zinc Ahead
