= First Light Imaging =

French scientific camera company

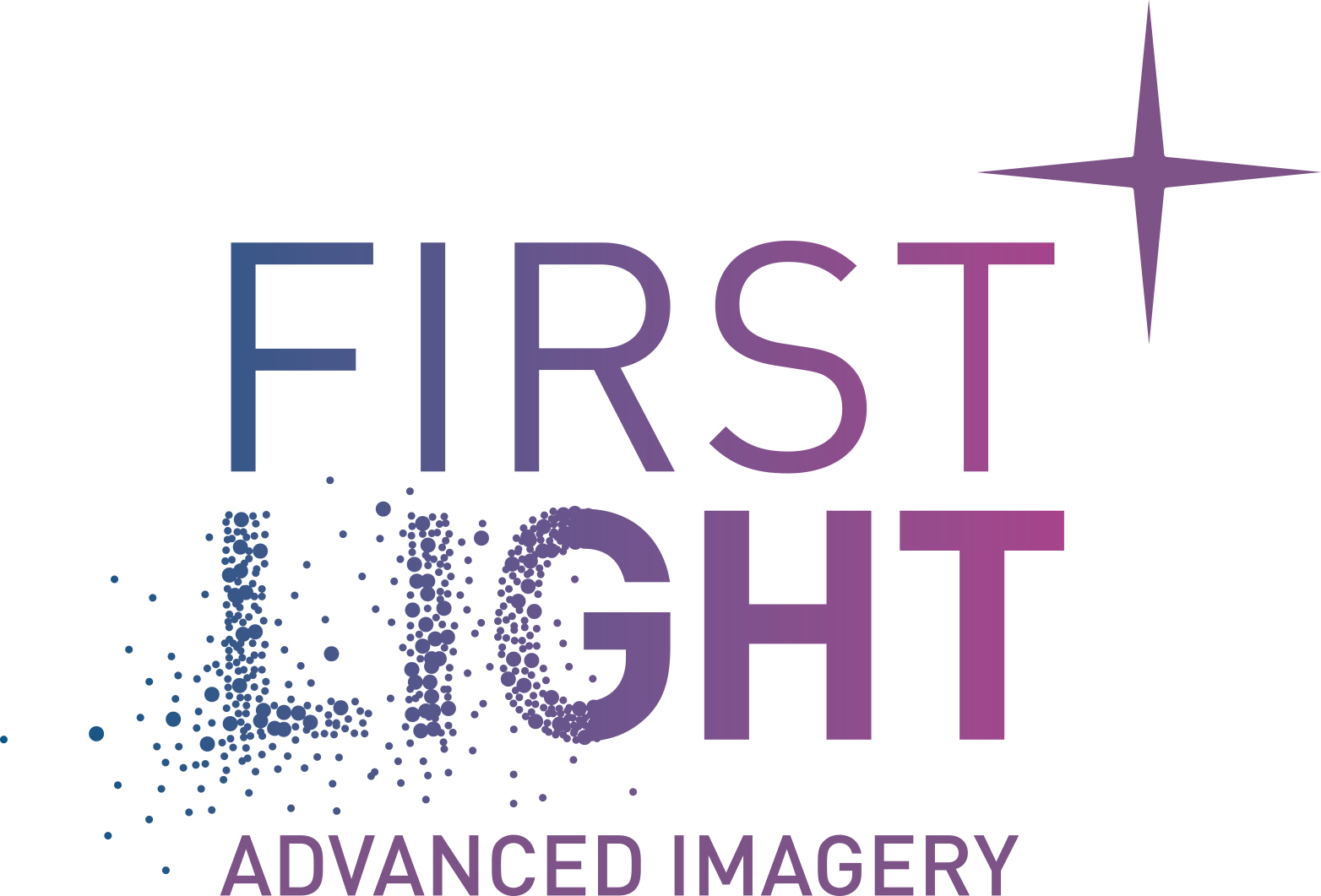
- Industry: Scientific instrumentation
- Founded: 2011
- Founder: David Boutolleau; Jean-Luc Gach; Philippe Feautrier; Eric Stadler
- Headquarters: Meyreuil, France
- Area served: Worldwide
- Revenue: 1-2M€
- Number of employees: 10-15
- Subsidiaries: First Light Imaging Corp.
- Website: https://www.first-light-imaging.com

First Light Imaging is a French company headquartered in Meyreuil near to Aix-en-Provence, France. The company designs and manufactures scientific cameras for visible and infrared spectra based on EMCCD, e-APD. and InGaAs technologies.

First Light Imaging's products are used to high-end scientific application such as astronomy, adaptive optics, biological imaging and industry.

== History ==
The company, founded in 2011, is a spin-off of 3 French laboratories: Laboratoire d'Astrophysique de Marseille (LAM), Institut de Planétologie et d'Astrophysique de Grenoble (IPAG) and the Haute-Provence Observatory (OHP).

The European Commission as part of the Horizon 2020 SME Instrument phase 2 has supported First Light Imaging for the development of C-RED One, an ultrafast low noise short-wavelength infrared commercial camera based on e-APD MCT technology.

First Light Imaging is a member of several French competitiveness clusters: Optitec, Alpha-Route des Lasers and Opticsvalley.

First Light Imaging is also a member of Aix-Marseille French Tech.

In January 2016, First Light Imaging created a US subsidiary located in San Francisco, California.

10 January 2024, First Light Imaging is acquired by Oxford Instruments.

== Products ==
First Light Imaging designs and manufactures high speed and low noise scientific cameras for both visible and infrared spectra.

- OCAM² is an ultrafast low noise camera, coming from a transfer of know-how from French laboratories and leading to the creation of the company. OCAM² is operating on the visible wavelength (from 400 to 900 nm) and based on an EMCCD sensor from E2V / Teledyne. A version with an electronic shutter embedded is also available.
- C-RED One is a scientific camera operating on the short-wave infrared wavelength (from 0.8 to 2.5 μm) based on a e-APD MCT sensor from LEONARDO.
- C-RED 2 is a scientific camera operating on the short-wave infrared wavelength (from 0.9 to 1.7 μm) based on an InGaAs sensor from SOFRADIR.

First Light Imaging's cameras are used at the Subaru Telescope in Hawaii; the GranTeCan telescope in the Canary Islands; and the MIRC-X interferometry instrument on the CHARA Telescope.

Since 2014, First Light Imaging also brings its expertise to the JPL NASA.

== Awards ==
2014: The French Newspaper La Provence has rewarded First Light Imaging during its Economic Awards annual ceremony.

2015: First Light Imaging's founder Jean-Luc Gach was rewarded on January 13 with the Crystal Medal of the CNRS among 16 people. This medal honors very innovative engineers and technicians who contribute to French Research Excellency.

2016: First light Imaging won the Prism Awards for Photonics Innovation in the "Imaging and Cameras" category, for the development of C-RED One. The Prism Awards is a leading international competition, organized by SPIE and Photonics Media

== Acquisition ==
On 10 January 2024, it was announced that Oxford Instruments acquired First Light Imaging.
