= Air displacement pipette =

Type of micropipette

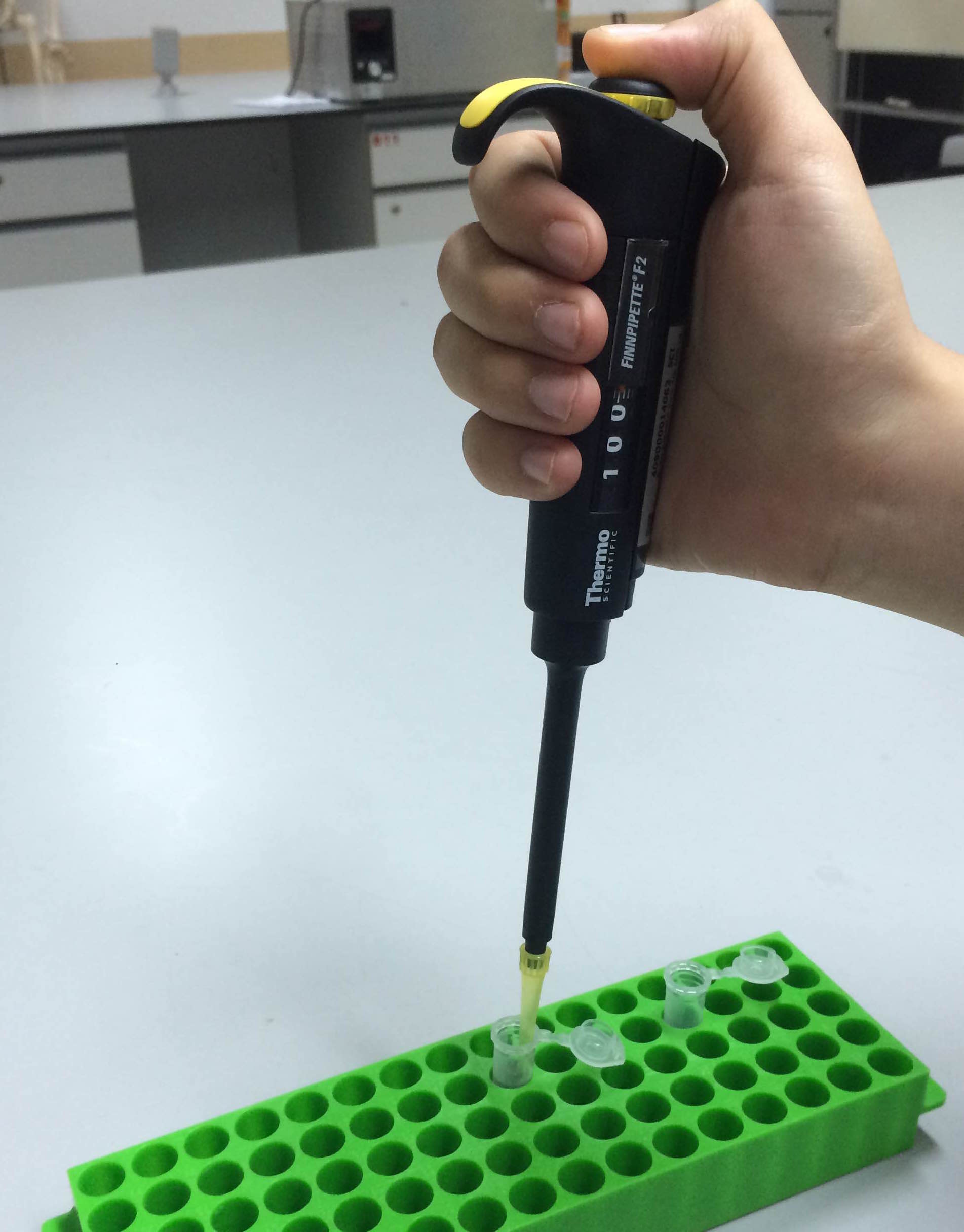
Micropipette in action

Piston-driven air displacement pipettes are a type of micropipette, which are tools to handle volumes of liquid in the microliter scale. They are more commonly used in biology and biochemistry, and less commonly in chemistry; the equipment is susceptible to damage from many organic solvents.

== Operation ==
Schematic diagram of an air displacement pipette. The "Digital volume indicator" is a dial display that indicates the digits (i.e. unrelated to electronic). The components vary between brands and different volume sizes have different components, for example the piston in a P2 is needle-like and can be separated with ease from the piston assembly whereas in a P10ML it is drum-like and over 1 cm in diameter and is enclosed in plastic.

These pipettes operate by piston-driven air displacement. A vacuum is generated by the vertical travel of a metallic or ceramic piston within an airtight sleeve. The upward movement of the piston, driven by the depression of the plunger, creates a vacuum in the space left vacant by the piston. To fill the vacuum, air from the tip rises, which is then replaced by the liquid that is drawn up into the tip and thus available for transport and dispensing elsewhere.

Sterile technique prevents liquid from coming into contact with the pipette itself. Instead, the liquid is drawn into and dispensed from a disposable pipette tip that is discarded after transferring fluid and a new pipette tip is used for the next transfer. Depressing the tip ejector button removes the tip, that is cast off without being handled by the operator and disposed of safely in an appropriate container. This also prevents contamination of or damage to the calibrated measurement mechanism by the substances being measured.

The plunger is depressed to both draw up and dispense the liquid. Normal operation consists of depressing the plunger button to the first stop while the pipette is held in the air. The tip is then submerged in the liquid to be transported and the plunger is released in a slow and even manner. This draws the liquid up into the tip. The instrument is then moved to the desired dispensing location. The plunger is again depressed to the first stop, and then to the second stop, or 'blowout', position. This action will fully evacuate the tip and dispense the liquid. In an adjustable pipette, the volume of liquid contained in the tip is variable; it can be changed via a dial or other mechanism, depending on the model. Some pipettes include a small window which displays the currently selected volume. The plastic pipette tips are designed for aqueous solutions, and are not recommended for use with organic solvents that may dissolve the plastics of the tips or even the pipettes.

=== Main parts of a micropipette ===
1. Plunger button
2. Tip ejector button
3. Volume adjustment dial
4. Digital volume indicator
5. Shaft
6. Attachment point for a disposable tip

== Models ==
Several different type of air displacement pipettes exist:

- adjustable or fixed
- volume handled
- Single-channel or multi-channel or repeater
- adjustable tip spacing
- conical tips or cylindrical tips
- standard or locking
- manual or electronic
- manufacturer

=== Adjustable or fixed volume ===
Micropipettes can take a minimum volume of 0.2 μL and maximum volume of 10,000 μL (10 mL). They thus are used for smaller-scale transfers than equipment such as graduated pipettes, which come in 5, 10, 25 and 50 mL volumes.

The most common type of pipettes can be set to a certain volume within its operational range and are called adjustable. These pipettes commonly have a label with their volume range like "10–100 μL". These limits are indeed the limits as overwinding these limits would result in damage of the pipetting system. The fixed volume pipette cannot be changed. As there are less moving parts, the mechanism is less complex, resulting in more accurate volume measurement.

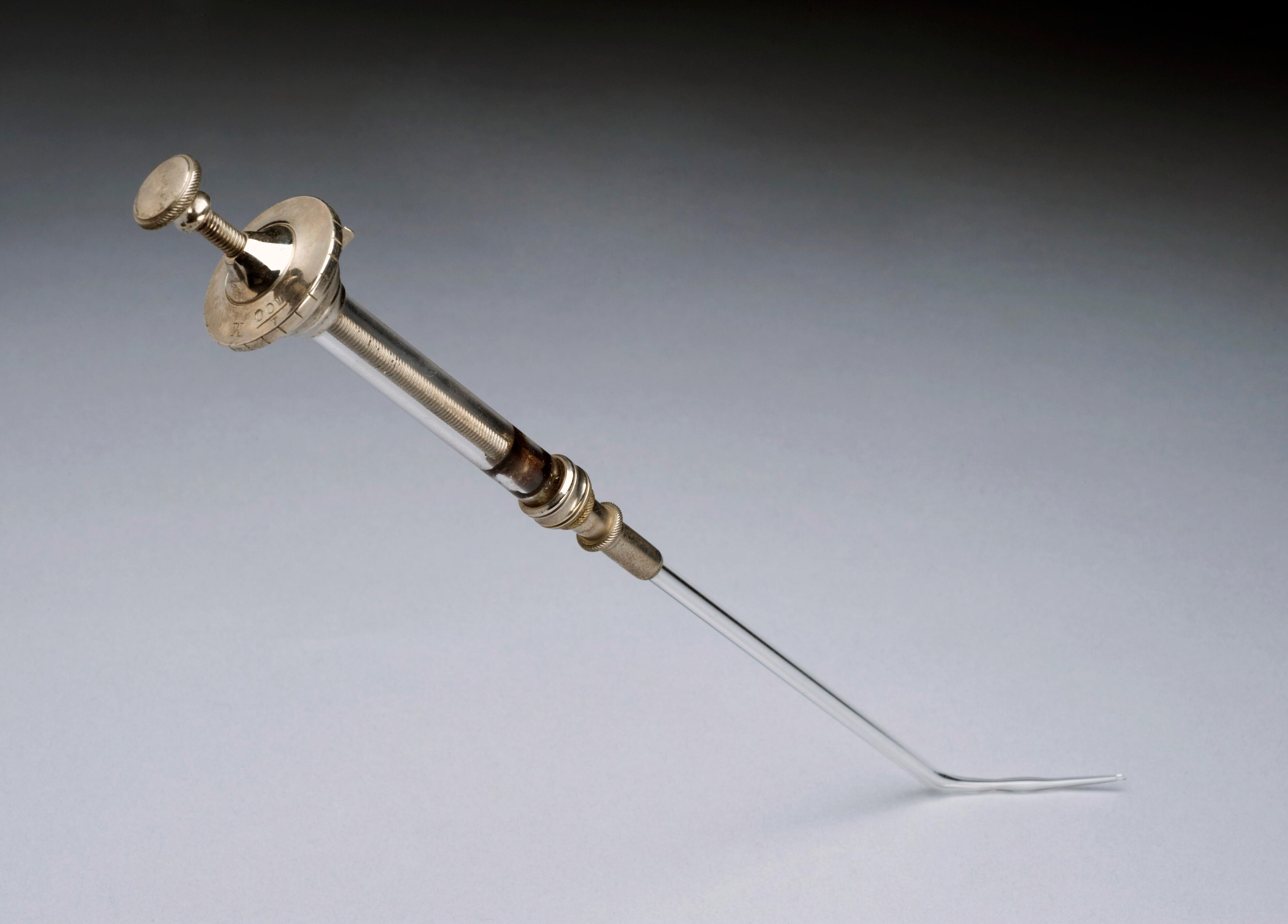
Adjustable micropipette used by Lister during or prior to 1877

The first known adjustable air displacement micropipette dates back to as early as 1877 (photograph shown at right), but in 1972, several people of the University of Wisconsin–Madison (mainly Warren Gilson and Henry Lardy) enhanced the fixed-volume pipette, developing the modern pipette with a variable volume. Warren Gilson founded Gilson Inc. based on this invention.

=== Volume ===
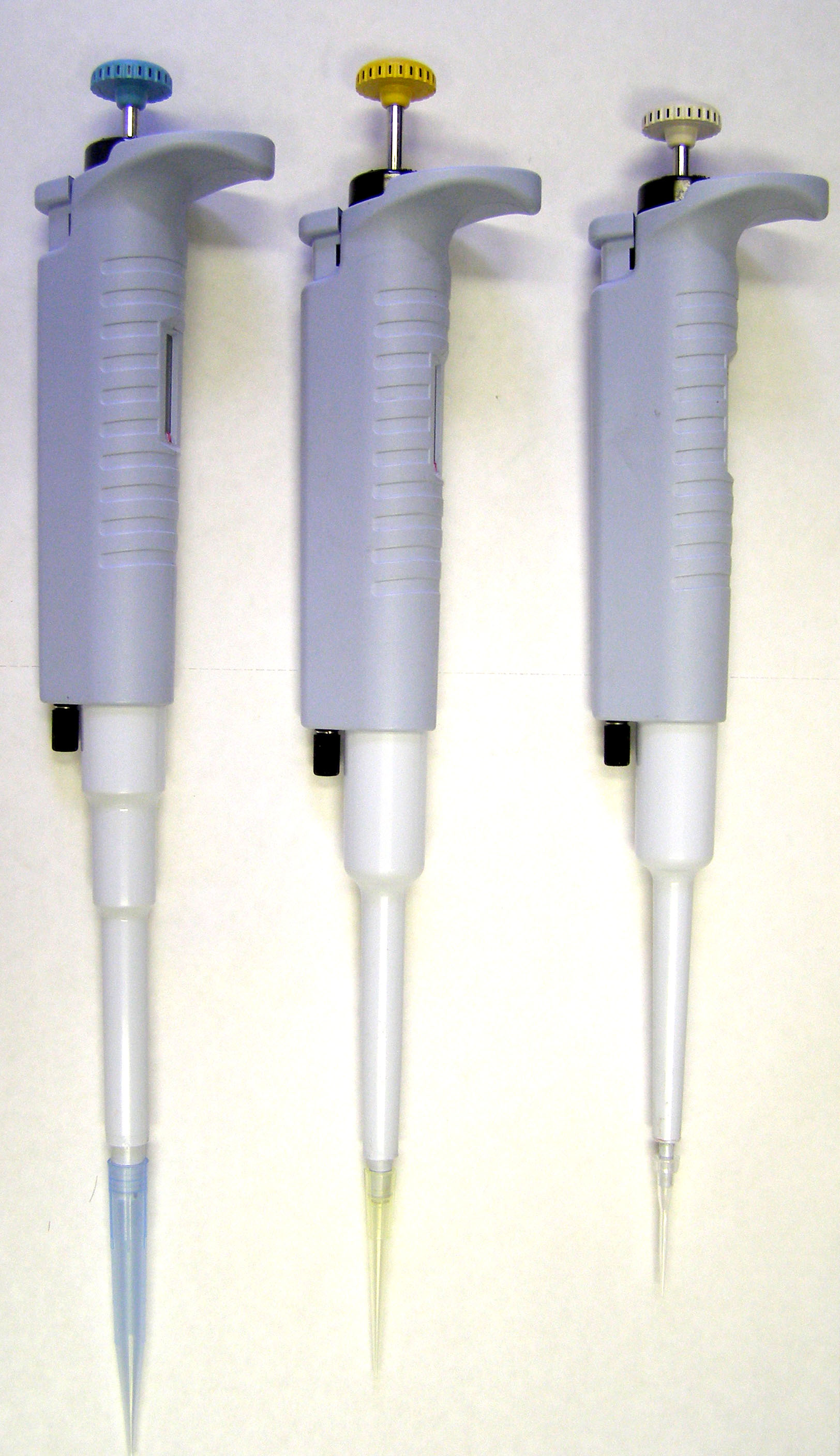
Three air-displacement pipettes that handle different volumes.

For optimal usage, every pipette supplier offers a broad range of different capacities, commonly including 2, 10, 20, 100, 200, and 1000 μL capacity pipettes. A small volume range of a pipette like 10–100 μL results in a much higher accuracy than a broad range from 0.1–1,000 μL per pipette.

With regard to the volume transferred, the smallest pipette that can handle the required volume should be selected. This is important because accuracy decreases when the set volume is close to the pipette's minimum capacity. Generally, a pipette has optimal accuracy from 35-100% of its nominal volume, and should not be used below 10% of that volume. For example, using a 1,000 μl pipette for 50 μl of liquid is not ideal, and using a 100 μl pipette will give better results.

Other factors like tip angle and immersion depth may also impact accuracy substantially. Other methods may be necessary, like reverse pipetting for viscous liquids, or saturating the air inside a pipette with liquid vapor by pipetting up and down multiple times to "prime" the pipette before actually transferring liquid when pipetting a volatile liquid.

=== Tips ===
For the pipetting process there are two components necessary: The pipette and disposable tips. The tips are plastic-made tools for single-use. In general, they are made of Polypropylene. Depending on the size of the pipette, the user needs specific tip sizes like: 10 μL, 100 μL, 200 μL, 1,000 μL, other non-standard sizes, such as 5,000 μL (5 mL) or 10,000 μL (10 mL). The majority of tips have a color code for easy spotting like natural (colorless) for low volumes (0.1–10 μL), yellow (10–100 μL), or blue (100–1,000 μL). The corresponding pipette has the same color code, printed on the pipette.

For special applications, there are filter-tips available. These tips have a little piece of foam plastic in the upper conus to prevent sample aerosols contaminating the pipette.

In general, all tips are stored in 8 × 12 boxes for 96 pieces in an upright position. The spacing of tips in these boxes is usually standardised for multichannel pipette compatibility from a number of different suppliers.

Commonly available pipette volumes
Name	Min. volume (μL)	Max. volume (μL)	Color on Gilson	tip size (μL)
P2	0.2	2	Orange	10
P10	1	10	Red	10
P20	2	20	Lemon	200
P100	20	100	Salmon	200
P200	50	200	Yellow	200
P1000	200	1000	Blue	1000
P5000	500/1000	5000	Purple	5000
P10000	1000	10000	Sky	10000

Two major tip systems exist, called conical or cylindrical, depending on the shape of the contact point of the pipettes and the tip.

=== Single-channel and multi-channel pipettes ===
Depending on the number of pistons in a pipette, there is a differentiation between single-channel pipettes and multi-channel pipettes. For manual high-throughput applications like filling up a 96-well microtiter plate most researchers prefer a multi-channel pipette. Instead of handling well by well, a row of 8 wells can be handled in parallel as this type of pipette has 8 pistons in parallel.

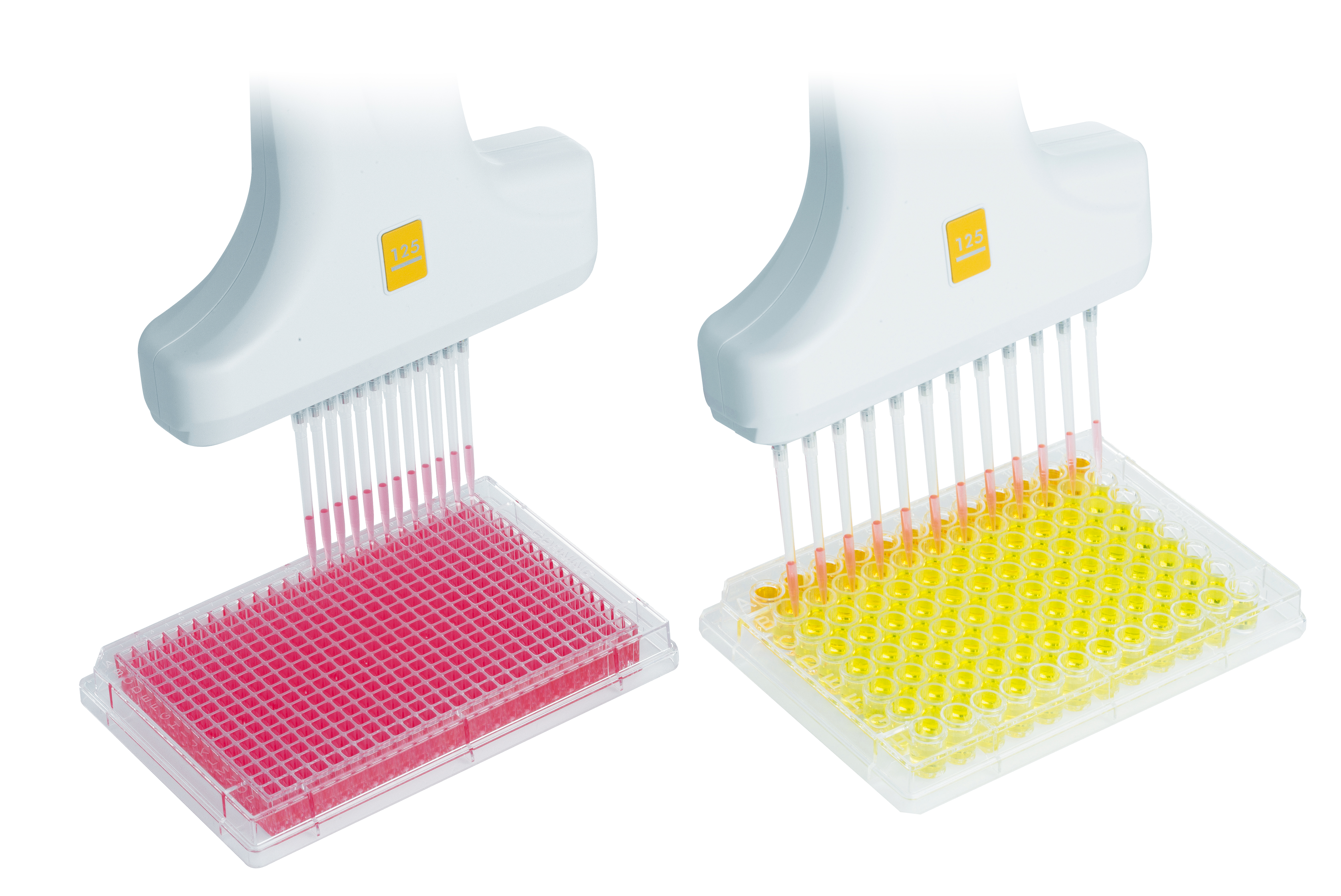
Adjustable tip spacing pipette transferring samples from a 384 well plate to a 96 well plate

=== Adjustable tip spacing pipettes ===
Some manufacturers offer adjustable tip spacing pipettes. These allow to transfer multiple samples in parallel between different labware formats.

=== Electronic pipettes ===
To improve the ergonomics of pipettes by reducing the necessary force, electronic pipettes were developed. The manual movement of the piston is replaced by a small electric motor powered by a battery. Whereas manual pipettes need a movement of the thumb (up to 3 cm), electronic pipettes have a main button. The programming of the pipette is generally done by a control wheel and some further buttons. All settings are displayed on a small display. Electronic pipettes can decrease the risk of RSI-type injuries.

=== Repeaters ===
Repeaters are specialized pipettes, optimized for repeated working steps like dispensing several times a specific volume like 20 μL from a single aspiration of a larger volume. In general, they have specific tips which do not fit on normal pipettes. Some electronic pipettes are able to perform this function using standard tips.

=== Locking mechanism ===
Some air displacement pipettes can additionally feature a locking mechanism (referred to as "locking pipettes") to allow better changing of volume yet preserving accuracy. By locking the set volume while performing several identical pipetting actions, accidental changes to the pipette volume setting are avoided. The lock mechanism is typically a mechanical toggle close to the pipette setting controls that interferes with the setting mechanism to prevent movement. Some pipettes, however, feature dials for setting the individual volume digits that can only be adjusted when unlocked by depressing and twisting the plunger.

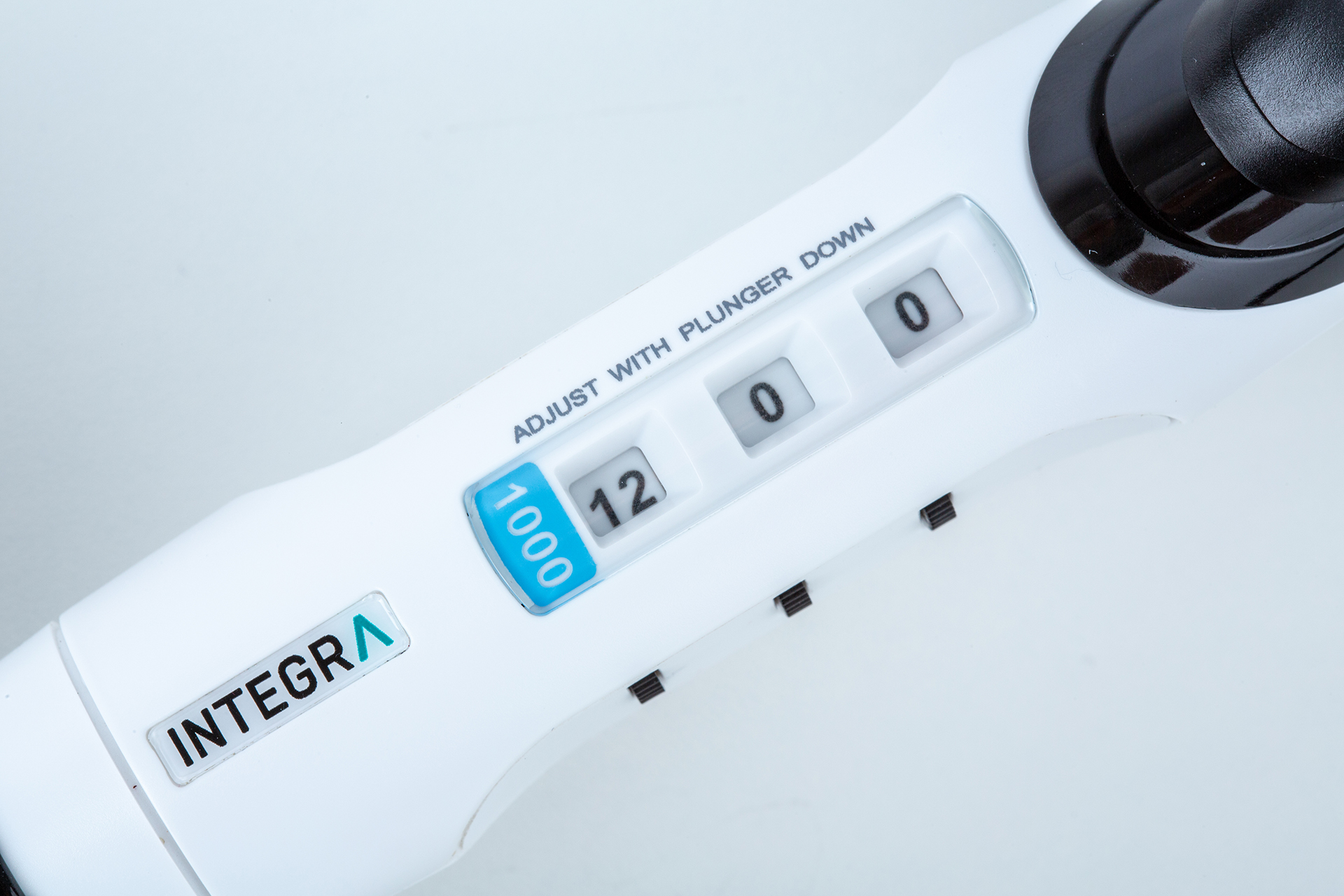
Volume dials on EVOLVE manual pipette from INTEGRA Biosciences

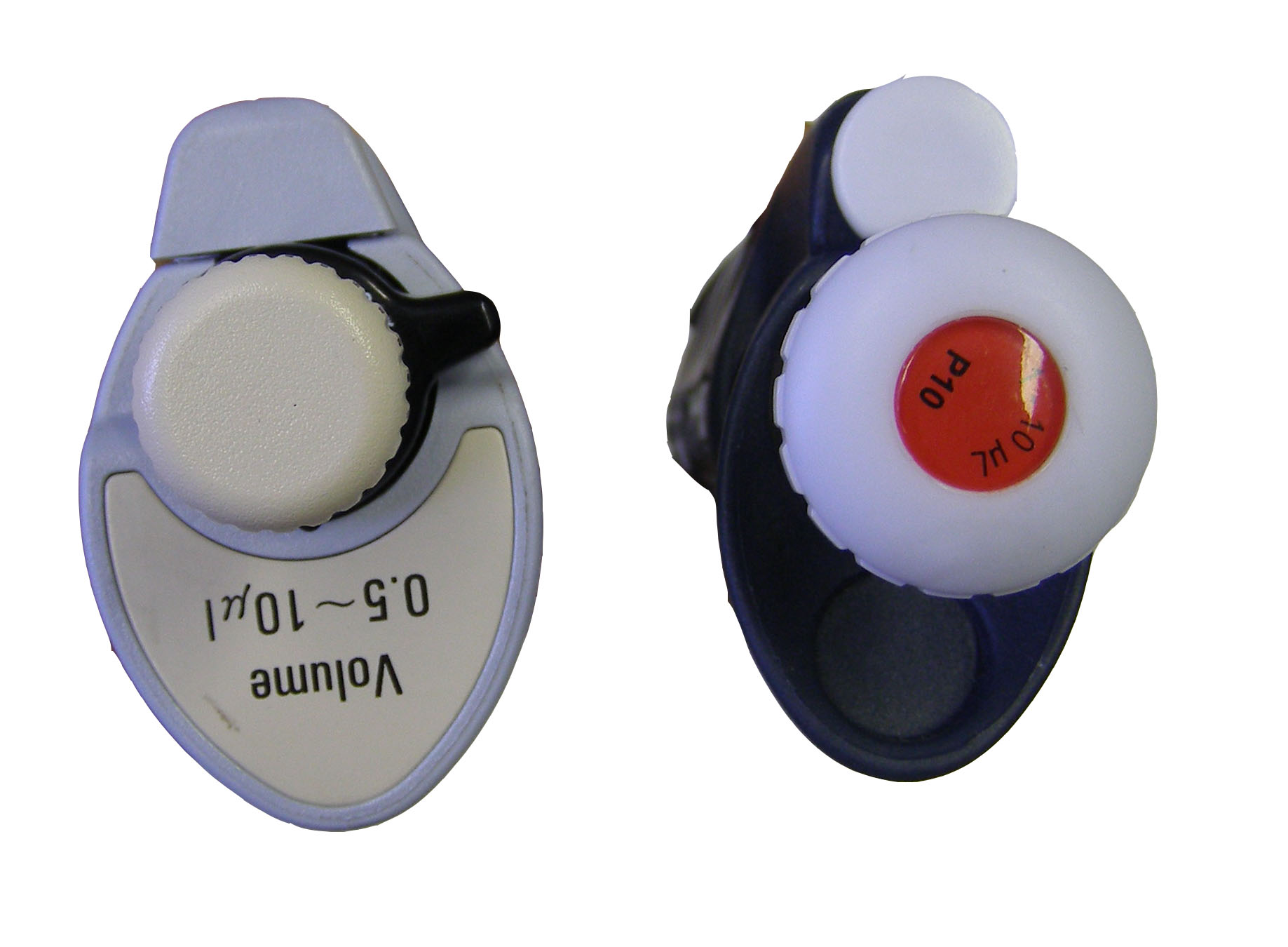

== Calibration ==
For sustained accuracy and consistent and repeatable operation, pipettes should be calibrated at periodic intervals. These intervals vary depending on several factors:

- The skill and training of the operators. Skilled operators tend to operate the instrument more correctly and make fewer accuracy-robbing mistakes.
- The liquid dispensed by the pipette. Corrosive and volatile liquids tend to emit vapors which ascend into the pipette shaft even under proper operating conditions and may corrode the metal piston and springs, or the seals and o-rings that provide an air-tight seal between the piston and the surrounding sleeve.
- Proper and careful handling. Pipettes that are frequently dropped, are subjected to careless handling or horseplay, or that are not properly stored in a vertical position, will tend to degrade in accuracy over time.
- The accuracy required by the instrument. Applications requiring maximum accuracy also demand more frequent calibration. Instruments used for purely research applications or in educational settings generally require less frequent calibration.

Under average conditions, most pipettes can be calibrated semi-annually (every six months) and provide satisfactory performance. Institutions that are regulated by the Food and Drug Administration's GMP/GLP regulations generally benefit from quarterly calibration, or every three months. Critical applications may require monthly service, while research and educational institutions may need only annual service. These are general guidelines and any decision on the appropriate calibration interval should be made carefully and include considerations of the pipette in question (some are more reliable than others), the conditions under which the pipette is used, and the operators who use it.

Calibration is generally accomplished through means of gravimetric analysis. This entails dispensing samples of distilled water into a receiving vessel perched atop a precision analytical balance. The density of water is a well-known constant, and thus the mass of the dispensed sample provides an accurate indication of the volume dispensed. Relative humidity, ambient temperature, and barometric pressure are factors in the accuracy of the measurement, and are usually combined in a complex formula and computed as the Z-factor. This Z-factor is then used to modify the raw mass data output of the balance and provide an adjusted and more accurate measurement.

The colorimetric method uses precise concentrations of colored water to affect the measurement and determine the volume dispensed. A spectrophotometer is used to measure the color difference before and after aspiration of the sample, providing a very accurate reading. This method is more expensive than the more common gravimetric method, given the cost of the colored reagents, and is recommended when optimal accuracy is required. It is also recommended for extremely low-volume pipette calibration, in the 2 microliter range, because the inherent uncertainties of the gravimetric method, performed with standard laboratory balances, becomes excessive. Properly calibrated microbalances, capable of reading in the range of micrograms (10^{−6} g) can also be used effectively for gravimetric analysis of low-volume micropipettes, but only if environmental conditions are under strict control. Six-place balances and environmental controls dramatically increase the cost of such calibrations.

== Additional images ==
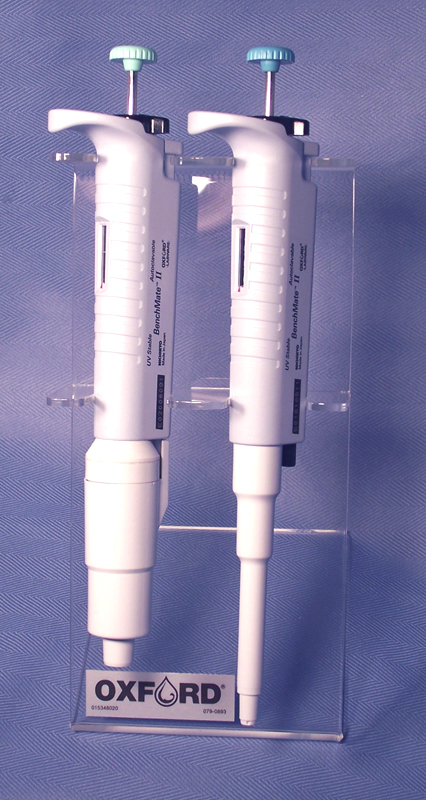
Oxford Single-Channel Pipettes

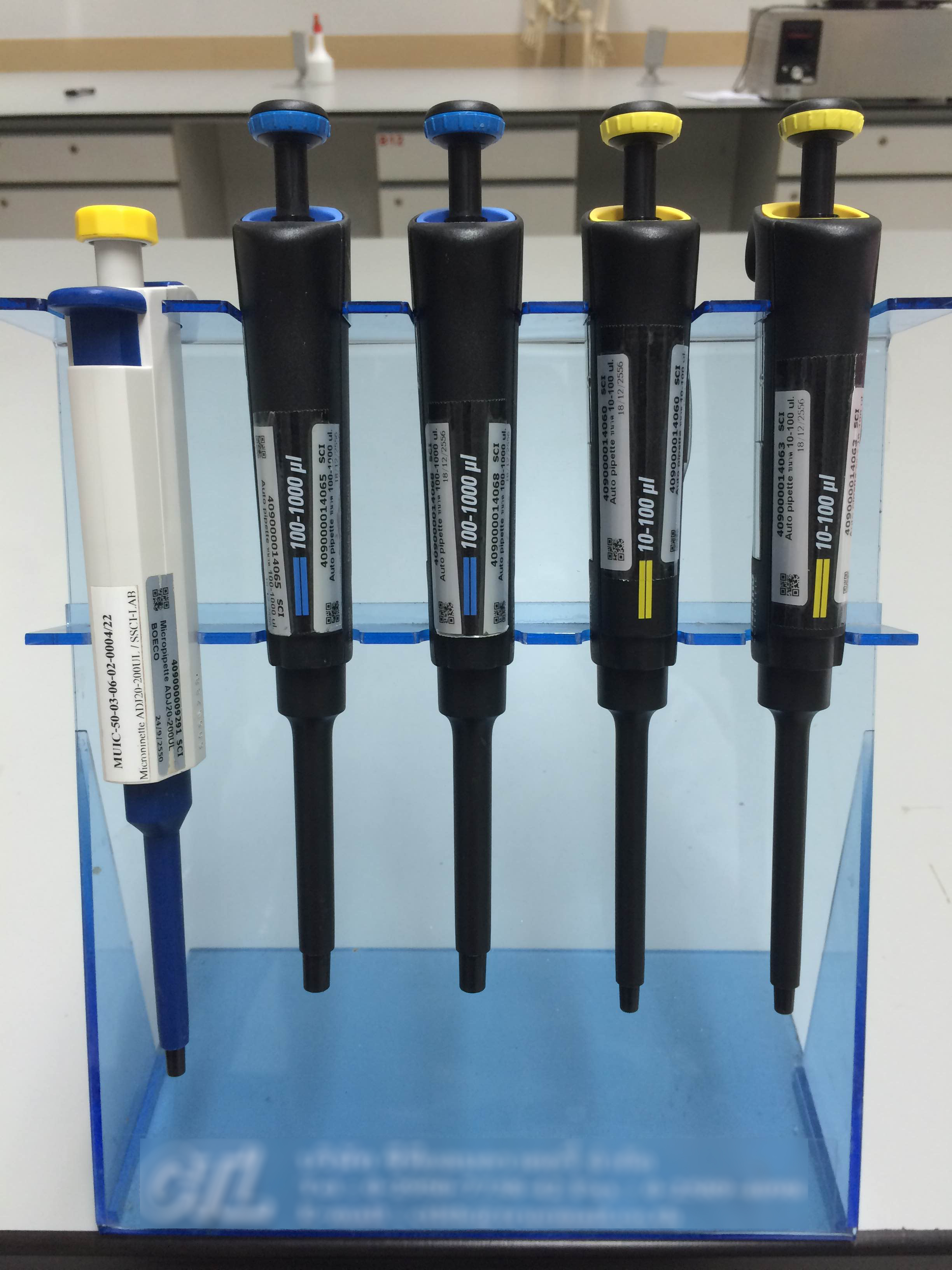
Different volumes of micropipettes.
