= Rubber bulb =

Chemistry equipment

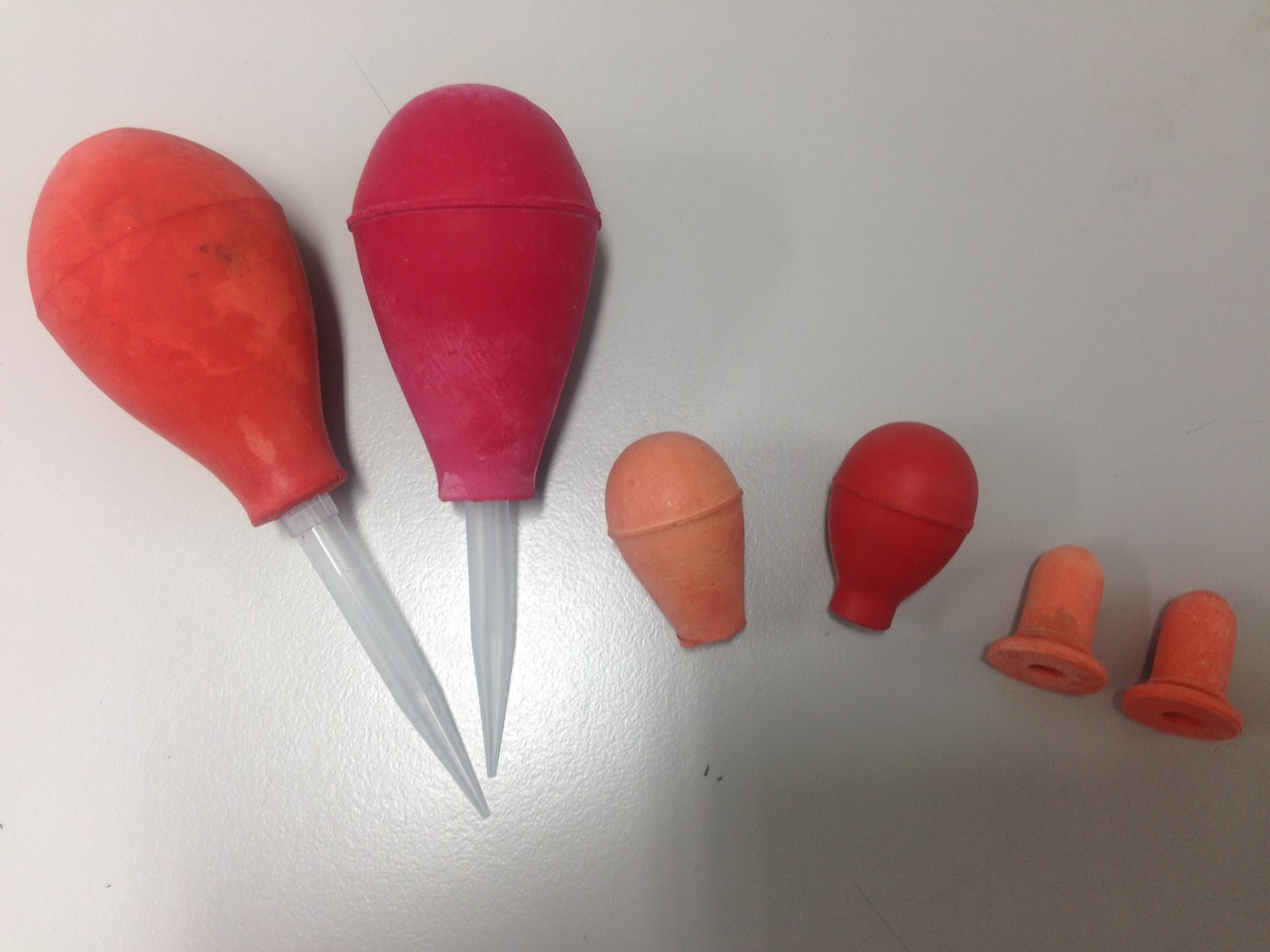
Different sizes of rubber bulbs

Rubber bulbs are used in chemistry laboratories, on top of glass or plastic tubes, forming pipettes. They serve as a vacuum sources for filling the pipettes with reagents and allow good control of releasing the reagents. Using bulbs rather than oral suction avoids the risk of oral contact with reagents.

== Large rubber bulbs ==
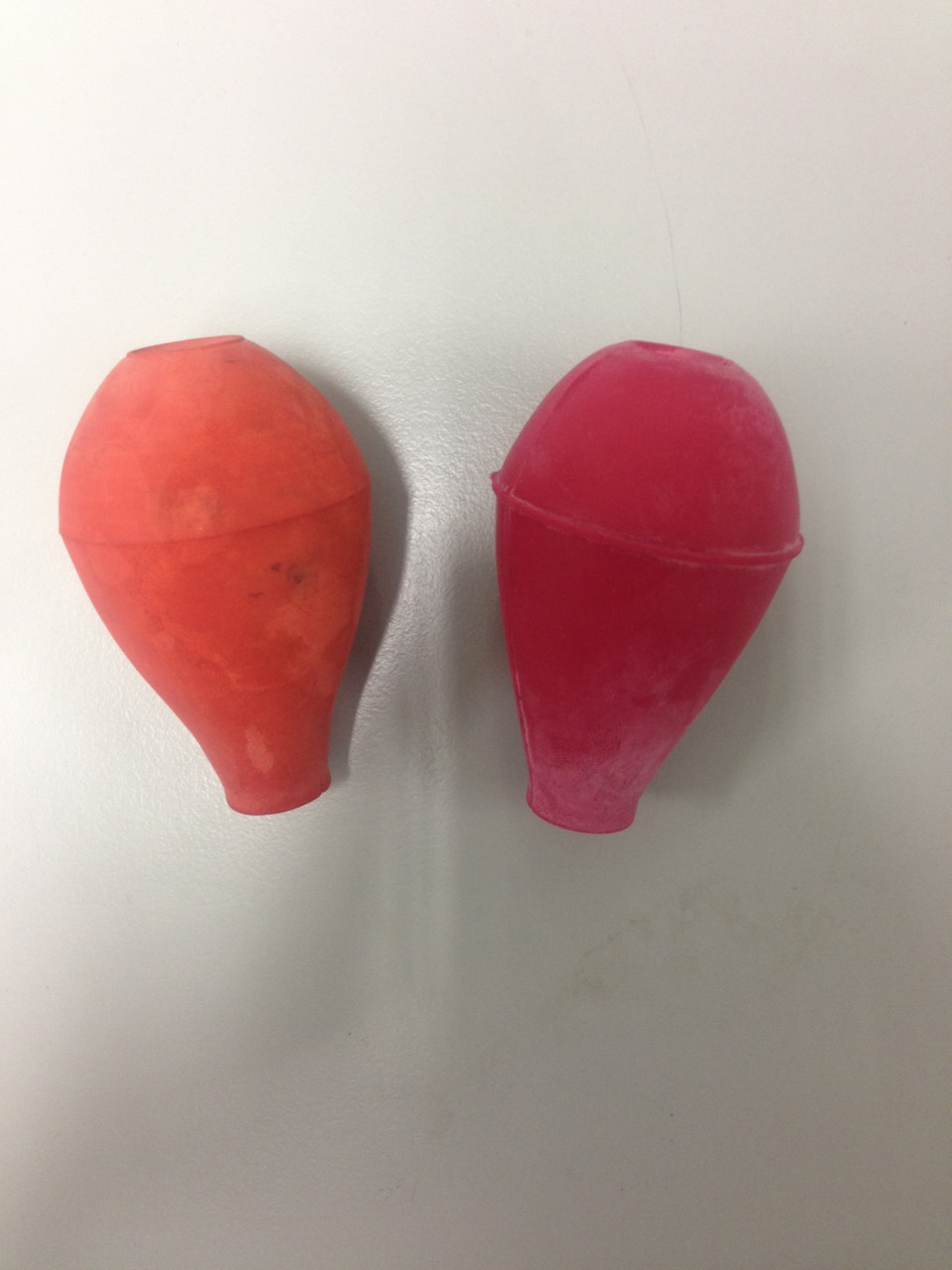
Large rubber bulbs

Larger rubber bulbs are commonly used to draw liquid through pipettes when reagents are needed in larger amounts. These rubber bulbs complement larger pipettes and plastic rods, as the glass will easily break due to uneven pressure distribution.

== Small rubber bulbs ==
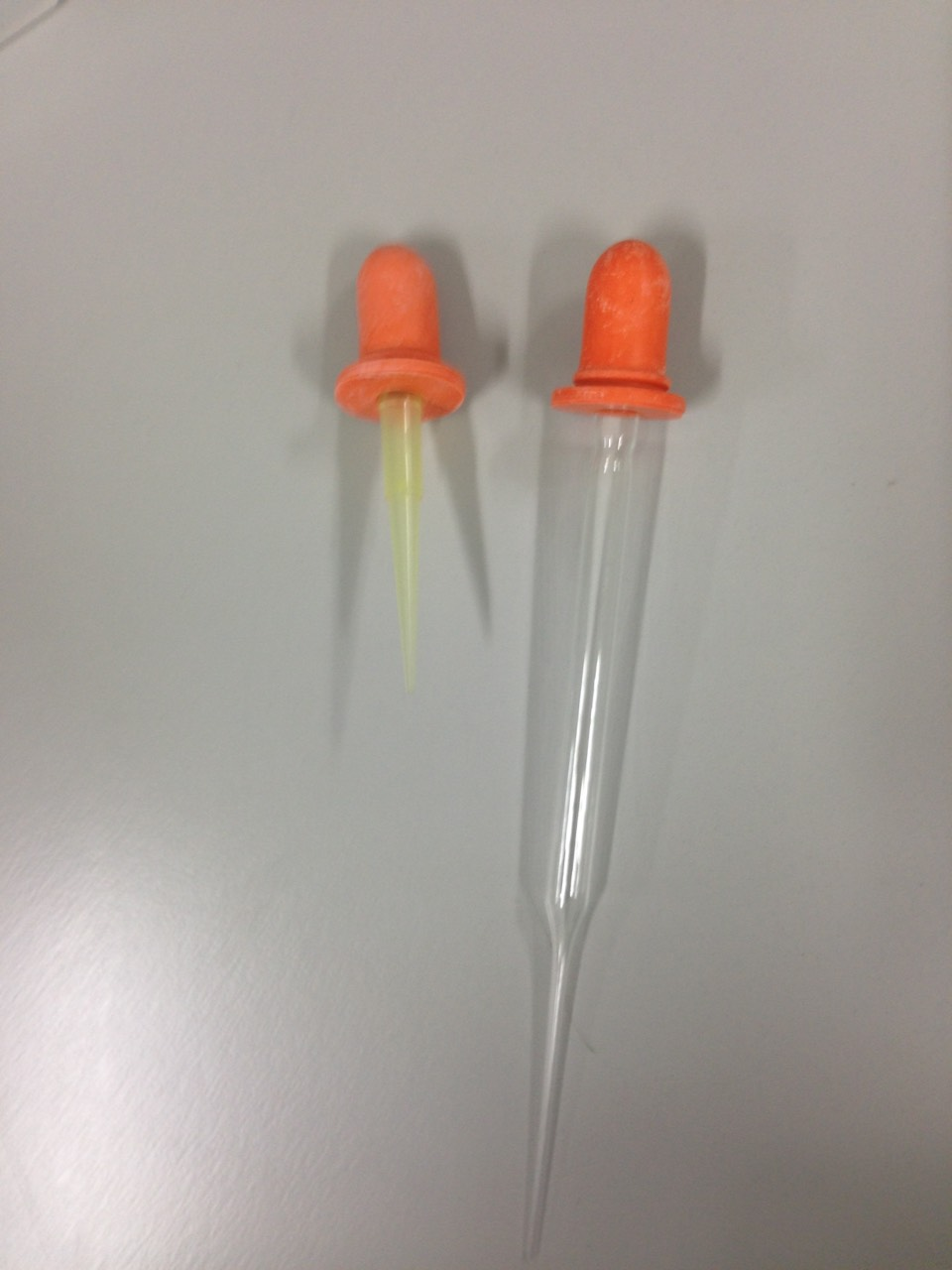
Small rubber bulbs attached to glass and plastic rods, used as dropper

Smaller rubber bulbs are well suited to small pipettes, drawing smaller amounts of reagents, and can be attached to both glass and plastic rods. They are very commonly used for droppers, as small rubber bulbs help control the number of drops accurately.

== Rubber bulb alternatives ==
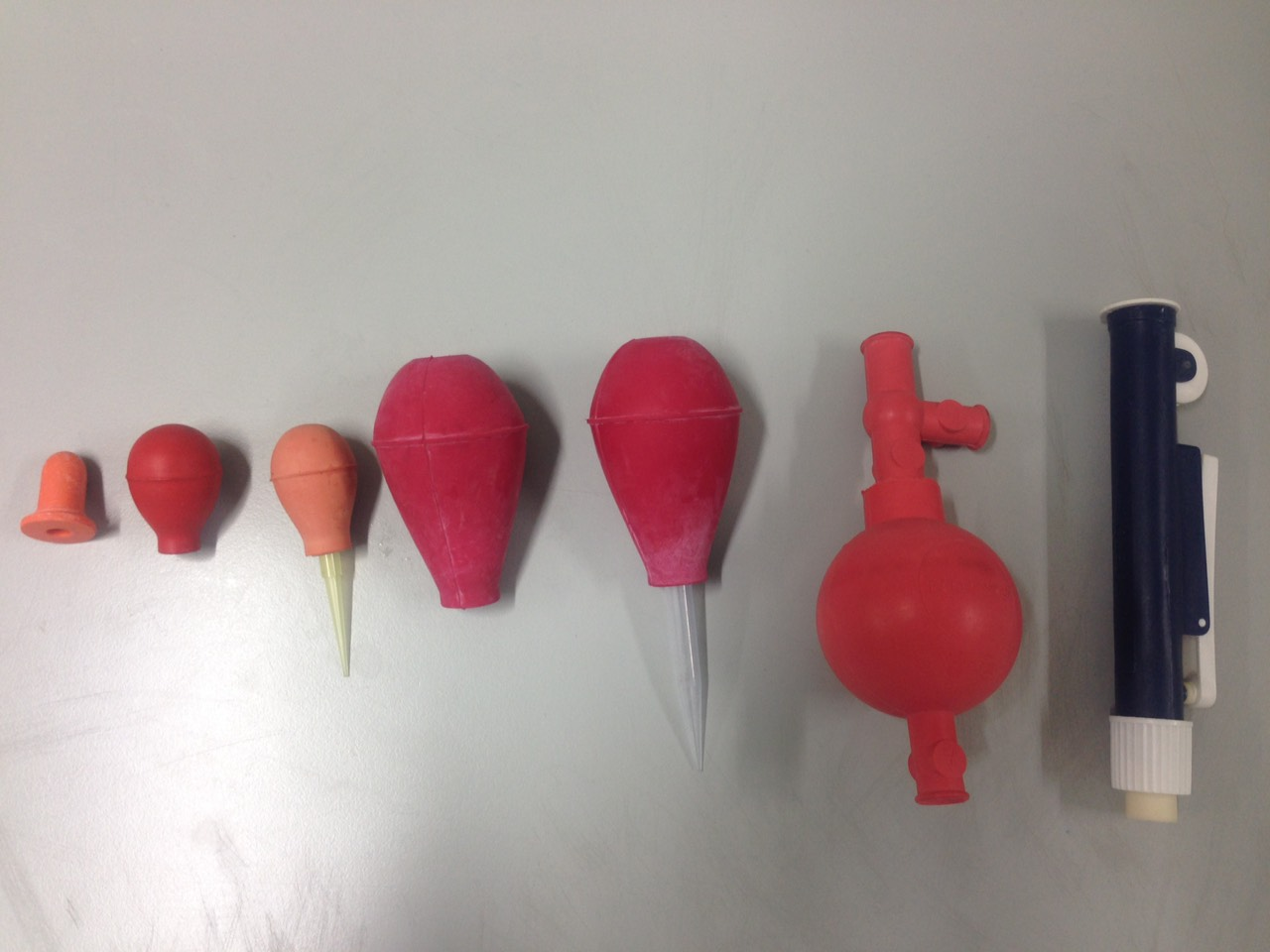
Different sizes of rubber bulb, flip style pipette filler and wheel style pipette filler

The rubber bulbs can also be replaced with wheel-style or flip-style pipette fillers. The flip-style fillers have two-valve systems and removable top valves, making cleaning easy, and one can be used with one hand. A plastic-wheel–style pump helps reduce the amount of work done by the user as there is no squeezing involved. The liquid is drawn up by wheel movement and can be easily released with a lever. It is also easy to clean.

== See also ==
- Pipette
- Pasteur pipette
- Automated pipetting system
