= Heinrich Schnitger =

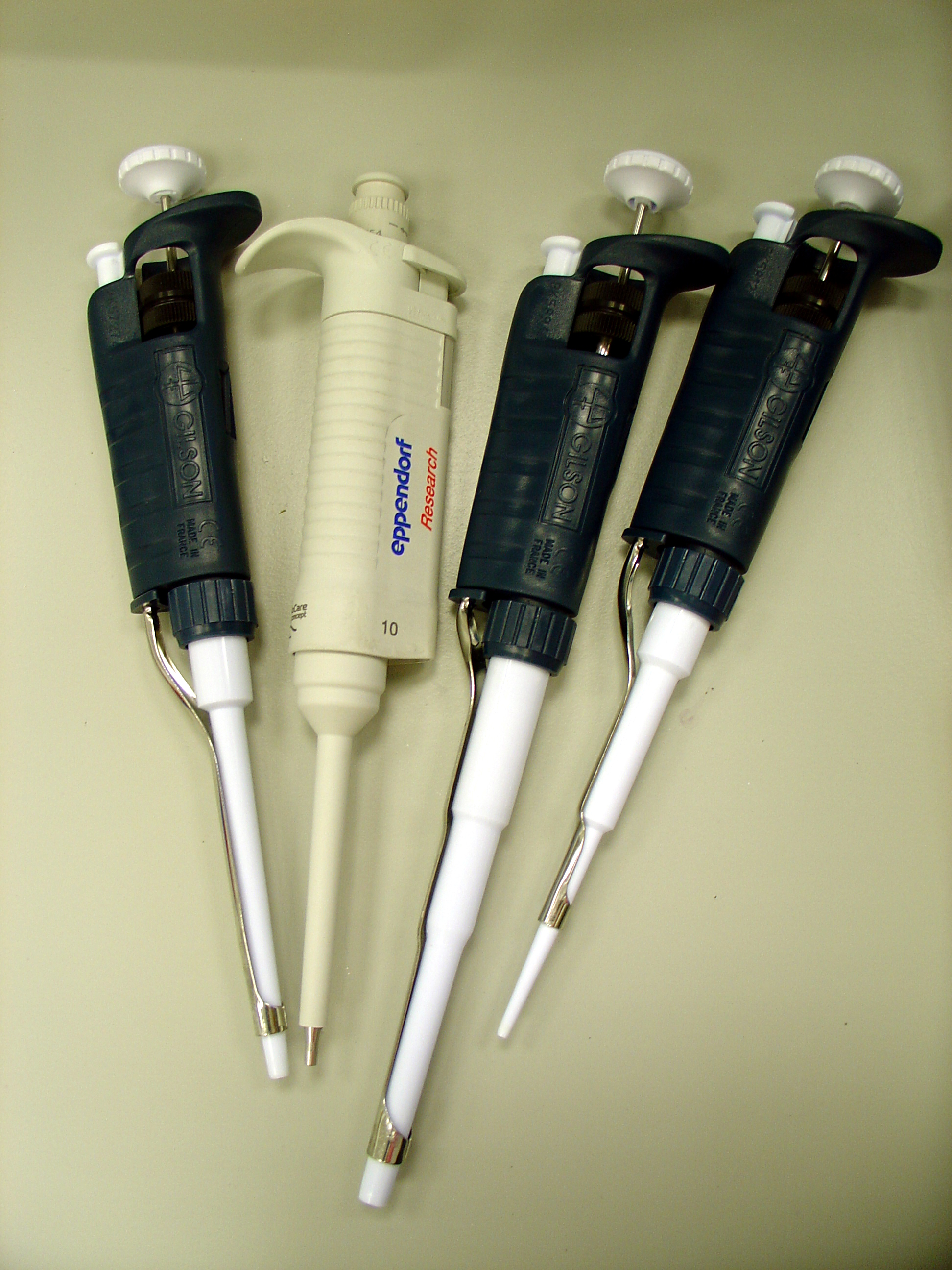
Micropipettes

Heinrich Schnitger (10 May 1925 in Lemgo – 27 August 1964 in Upper Bavaria) was a German physician. He is considered the inventor of the piston stroke Micropipette, a laboratory device for dispensing small amounts of liquid.

== Life ==
Heinrich Schnitger was born in 1925 in Lemgo, Westphalia, Germany, the son of an inventor who designed, among other things, a once widely used bicycle lock. As a young boy, Schnitger had already tinkered with and made many changes and improvements to various gadgets. After suffering from tuberculosis as a soldier in the Second World War, he decided to study medicine. He attained PhD after studying medicine in 1956 at the Philipps University of Marburg with a thesis on the development of a device for the automated determination of blood clotting times. During his subsequent work at the Institute of Physiological Chemistry, University of Marburg, among other things, he worked on further analysis of large numbers of chromatography samples with a volume of less than a millilitre. At that time, the usual method of liquid transfer was to use thin glass pipettes in which the fluids were aspirated directly or via a hose to the mouth.

For this work, Heinrich Schnitger constructed, in the spring of 1957, in cooperation with the mechanical workshop of the Institute, a novel device with which it was possible to dispense small amounts of fluid quickly and precisely by hand. In the same year, he presented under the title "A rapid and precise pipetting of small liquid quantities" a patent at the German Patent Office one, issued in 1961. The company Eppendorf improved the first "Marburg pipette" apparatus in cooperation with Heinrich Schnitger, and took over the exclusive license of the patent for commercialization.

Heinrich Schnitger died in 1964, before the global spread of his invention, due to an accident while swimming in a mountain lake in Upper Bavaria.

== Importance of his invention ==
The Micropipette developed by Heinrich Schnitger, which is often referred to as "Eppendorf pipette" in laboratory usage, counts today in various designs as standard almost every biomedical laboratories. For biologists, biochemists, biology laboratory technicians, medical-technical assistants and similar professions handling of these devices is an integral part of education and often a daily part of their work. For manual dosing of small volumes in the field of biomedical research, clinical chemistry, and the environmental and food analysis micropipettes have almost completely replaced other methods due to their ease of use and its precision.

The main contribution of Eppendorf, by the commercial success of the piston stroke was the development of interchangeable pipette tips made of polyethylene and polypropylene . From the American Gilson, attributed by Schnitger's invention in the early years of little importance, came in the early 1970s, the first piston pipettes with variably adjustable pipetting on the market, currently represent the most commonly used form. Further, based on the developed by Heinrich Schnitger basic principle variants are called multi-channel pipettes for simultaneous dosing over eight or twelve channels and pipettes with electronic adjustment and control of dosage.
