= Eye dropper =

Device used to transfer small quantities of liquids

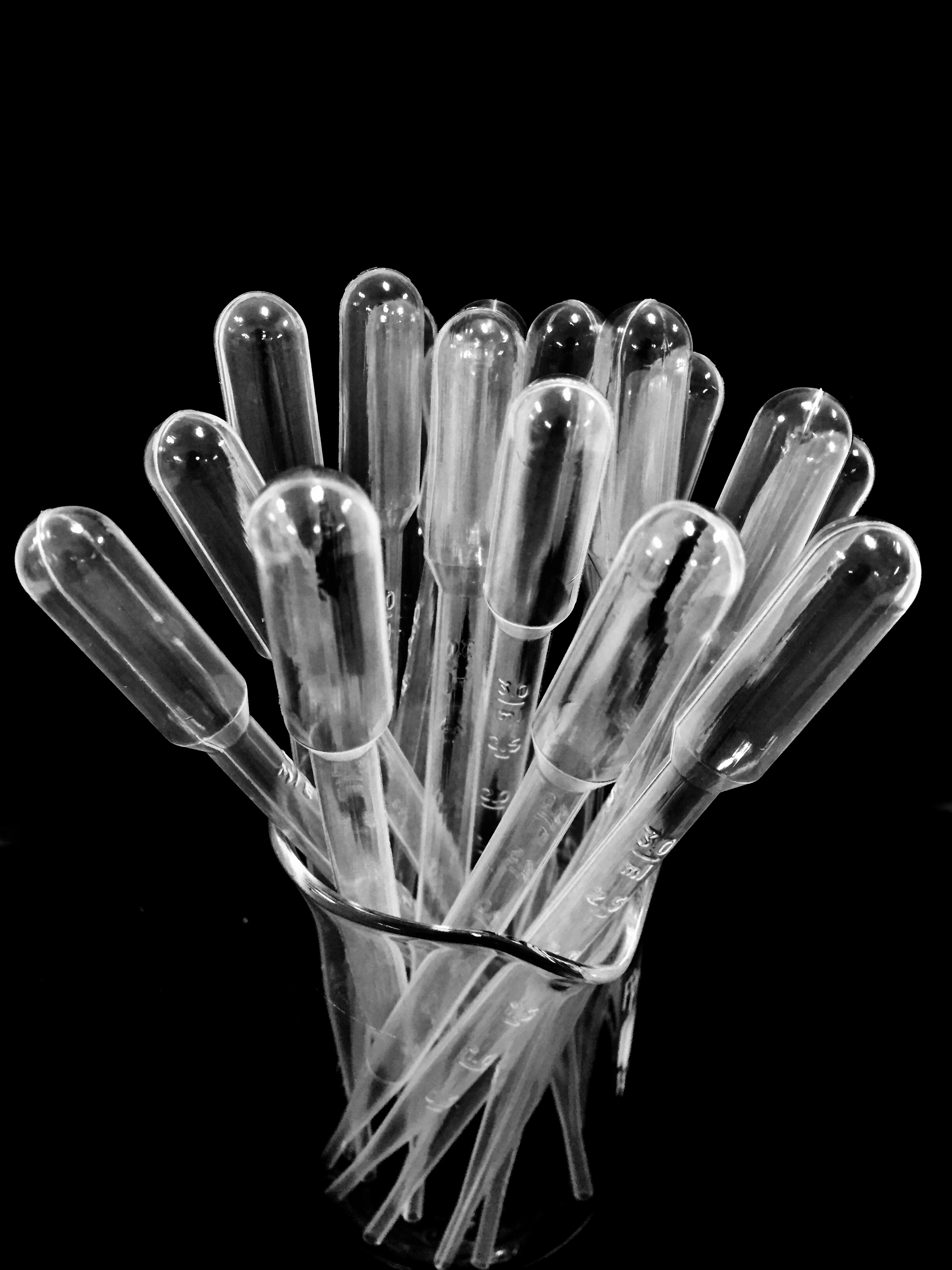
Plastic Pasteur pipettes

An eye dropper, also called Pasteur pipette or simply dropper, is a device used to transfer small quantities of liquids. They are used in the laboratory and also to dispense small amounts of liquid medicines. A very common use is to dispense eye drops into the eye. The commonly recognized form is a glass tube tapered to a narrow point (a pipette) and fitted with a rubber bulb at the top, although many styles of both plastic and glass droppers exist. The combination of the pipette and rubber bulb has also been referred to as a teat pipette. The Pasteur pipette name is from the French scientist Louis Pasteur, who used a variant of them extensively during his research. In the past, there was no equipment to transfer a chemical solution without exposing it to the external environment. The hygiene and purity of chemical compounds is necessary for the expected result of each experiment. The eye dropper, both glass and plastic types, can be sterilized and plugged with a rubber bulb at the open end of the pipette preventing any contamination from the atmosphere. Generally, they are considered cheap enough to be disposable, however, so long as the glass point is not chipped, the eye dropper may be washed and reused indefinitely.

== Overview ==
In laboratory use, droppers should not be used for work involving high accuracy since droppers are not designed to measure specific volume; however, it can be used to add drops of reagents. Each type of dropper is designed to produce a specific drop volume, but this is not highly precise. Before using a dropper, the tip should be carefully examined for cracks. To increase accuracy, the pipette is to be rinsed with the reagent. To use the dropper, the bulb is squeezed to expel air out of the pipette and the tip of the pipette is submerged into the solution vertically. The bulb is slowly released to draw the solution up, making sure that the solution does not overshoot into the bulb or else it may get contaminated. To dispense the reagent, the tip is held against the side of the target container at a 30 to 45 degrees angle.

Broken pasteur pipettes should be disposed of in an appropriate glassware container.

== History ==
This liquid handling tool, known as the "Pasteur Pipette," was first invented by the scientist Louis Pasteur in the 19th century. He is widely recognized for developing the pasteurization process, and the pipettes were named in his honor.

== Types ==
=== Glass Pasteur pipette ===
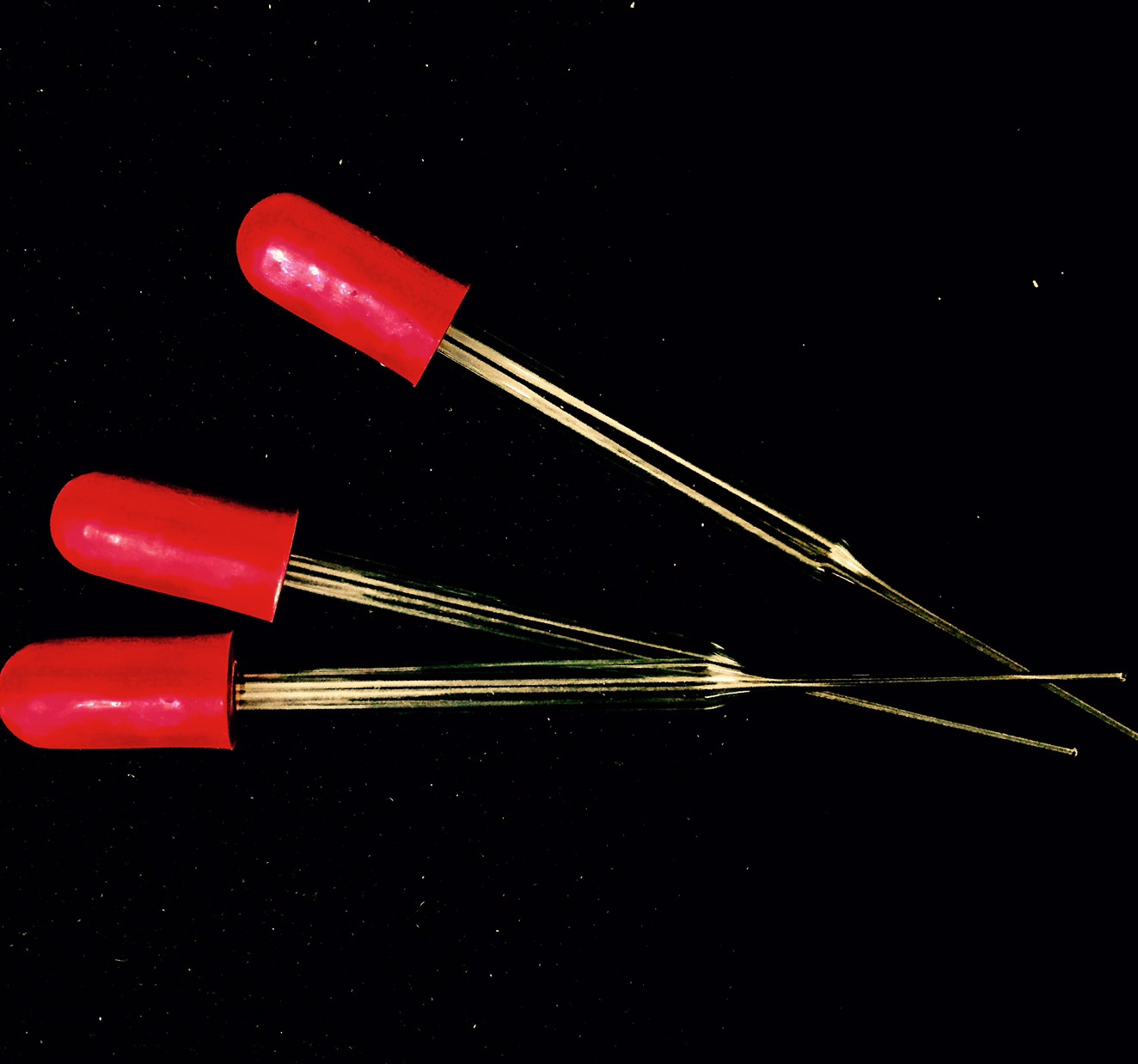
Glass Pasteur pipettes

The two types of glass that are usually found in the laboratory and in the Pasteur pipette are borosilicate glass and soda–lime glass. Borosilicate glass is a widely used glass for laboratory apparatus, as it can withstand chemicals and temperatures used in most laboratories. Borosilicate glass is also more economical since the glass can be fabricated easily compared to other types. Soda lime glass, although not as chemically resistant as borosilicate glass, is suitable as a material for inexpensive apparatus such as the Pasteur pipette.

Traditionally, glass Pasteur pipettes were made by heating lengths of glass tubing over a flame, before drawing them apart to form a long capillary. This capillary was further heated to bisect, producing two pipettes. Before the advent of rubber bulbs (also called teats) to generate a vacuum, liquid was drawn up through mouth suction. Nowadays, mouth-pipetting is either strongly discouraged or forbidden.

Glass Pasteur pipettes can also be used for microscale filtration. By plugging the top (the larger aperture) with cotton or glass wool, a solution may pass through the pipette while insoluble sediment is retained. A rubber bulb may be employed to provide additional pressure if gravity is insufficient.

Glass pasteur pipettes can be used to make spotters for thin layer chromatography after pulling it over a flame.

=== Plastic Pasteur pipette ===
A small plastic pasteur pipette with oil inside. The stem is cut off from the picture.

Plastic Pasteur pipettes, also referred to as transfer pipettes, have their stems and bulbs in the form of a single piece made of soft plastic such as polyethylene. The bulb portion is thinner and therefore "squeezable", while the pipette portion is thick enough to be rigid. They commonly come in 1, 2, 3, and 5 ml which comes with a specific drop size of 10, 20, 25, 35, and 50 μL. The volumes are usually marked on the stem, though the markings are rather crude and are not particularly accurate.

A plastic dropper is relatively inexpensive and disposable, so they are often used to avoid cross-contamination. In a solution containing cells or protein, it reduces the loss of cell or protein that binds to glass. Some plastic pipettes include a long flexible tube that can be bent for drawing solution from small volume tubes.

Plastic Pasteur pipettes are often used in biology where most media are aqueous and solvent resistance is not important. (Most organic solvents, such as hexane and acetone cannot be used in plastic Pasteur pipettes as the solvent can dissolve the plastic.) The pipettes are also hard to wash and are usually discarded with other biohazard waste after one use.

Plastic bulb pipettes are generally not precise enough to be used for exact measurements, whereas their glass counterparts can be extremely precise.

== Other usages ==
=== Microscale column chromatography ===
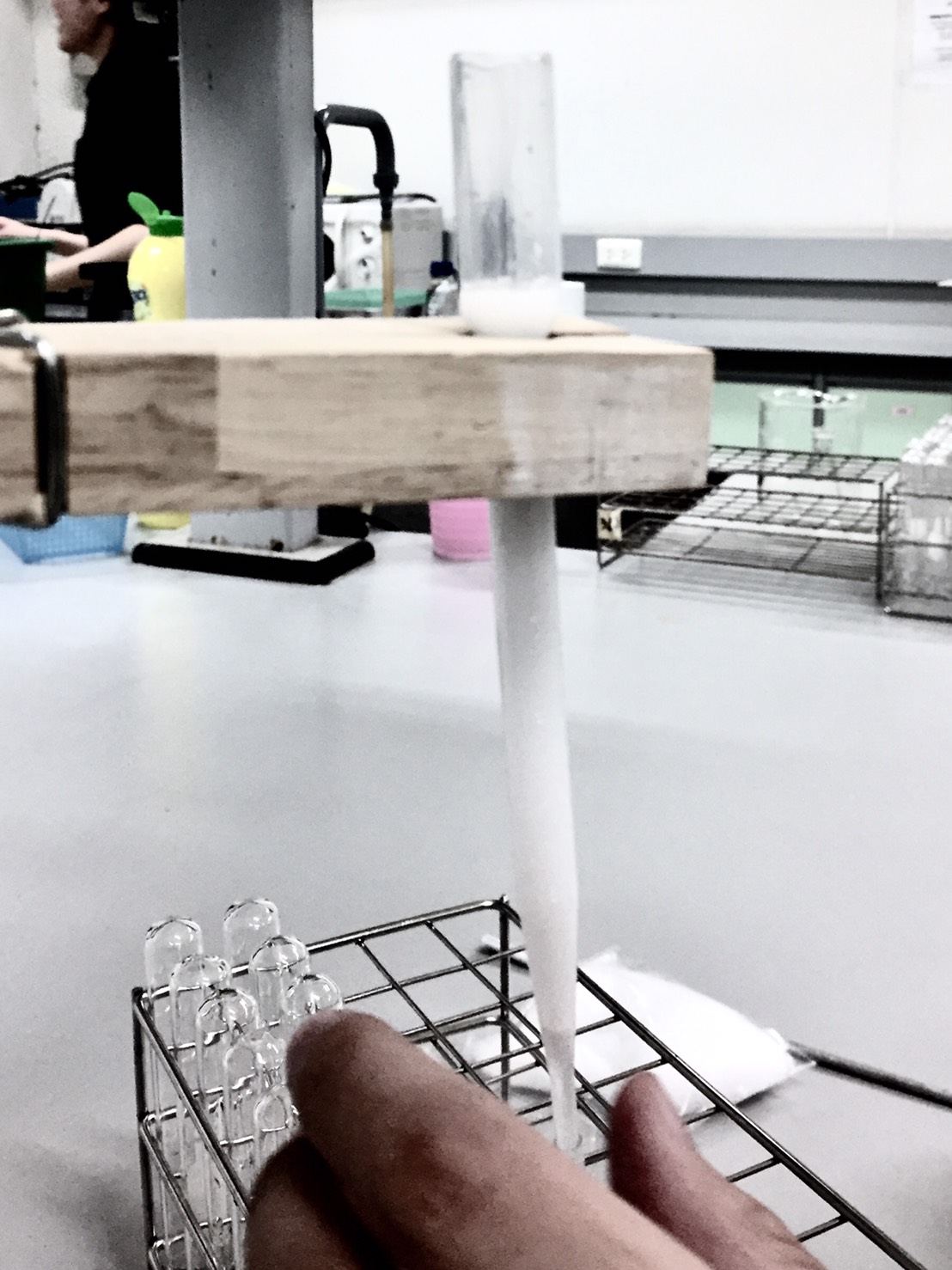
Column chromatography constructed using plastic Pasteur pipette

The constriction toward the tip of the Pasteur pipettes may be plugged with a bit of tissue paper or cotton wool to filter off solids from small amounts of liquids. The bulb can be attached and squeezed to help viscous solutions filter more rapidly.

With a bit of skill, Pasteur pipettes may also be used for microscale column chromatography. With appropriately fine silica gel, the bulb may be squeezed for microscale flash column chromatography.

=== Microscale distillation ===
Pasteur pipettes can also be used for microscale distillation. The liquid to be distilled is placed into a small reaction tube along with a boiling chip and heated to reflux one-half to two-thirds of the way up the inside of the tube. After squeezing the bulb to expel air, a pasteur pipette is inserted into the tube just below the level of the ring of refluxing liquid (into the vapor). The vapor is then drawn into the relatively cold pipette tip, causing it to condense and accumulate inside of the pipette.

=== Microscale liquid storage ===
Heat can be applied to the tip of a plastic Pasteur pipette to seal the solution and create a liquid-tight storage.

== Additional images ==
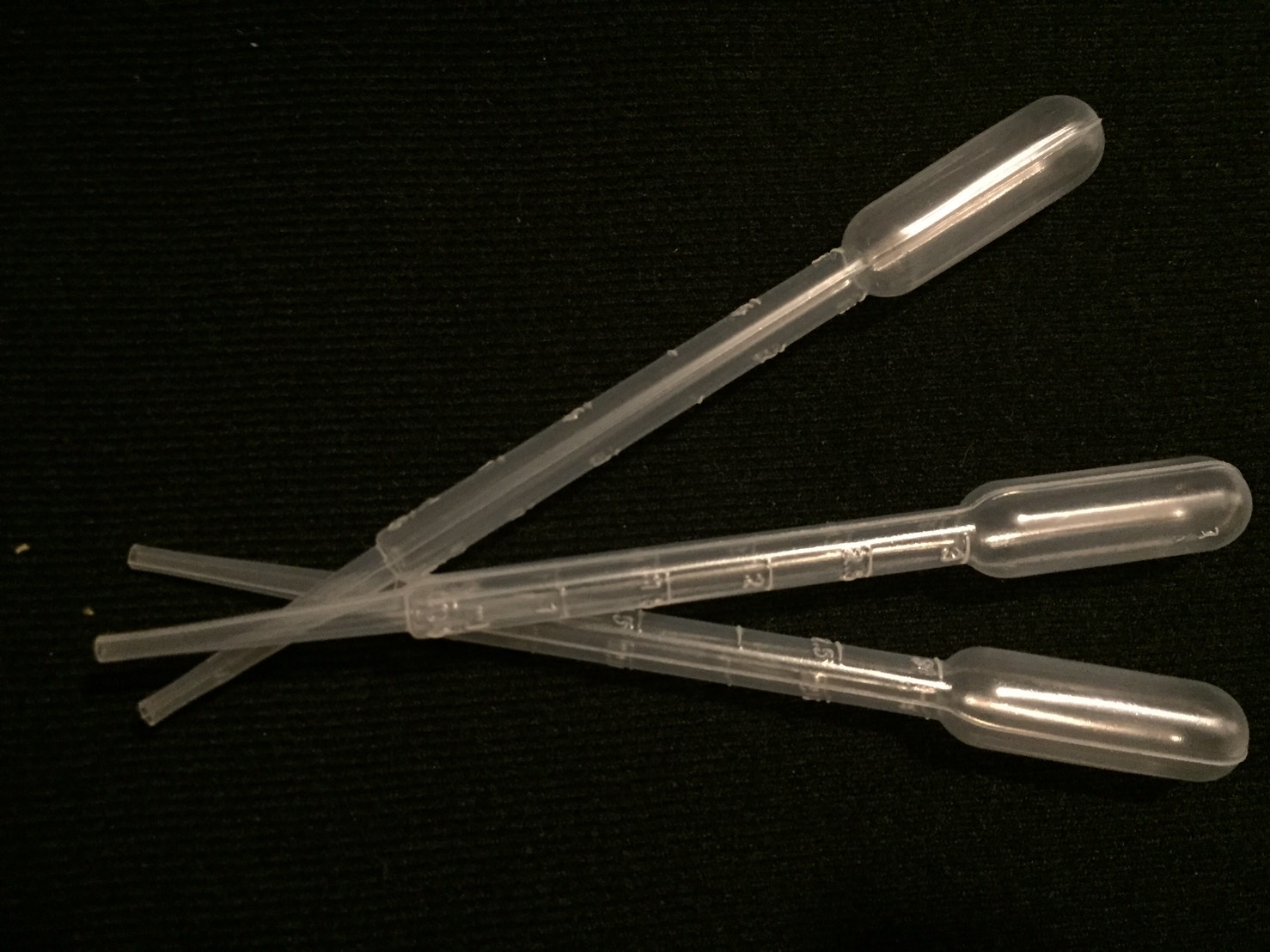
Plastic Pasteur pipette

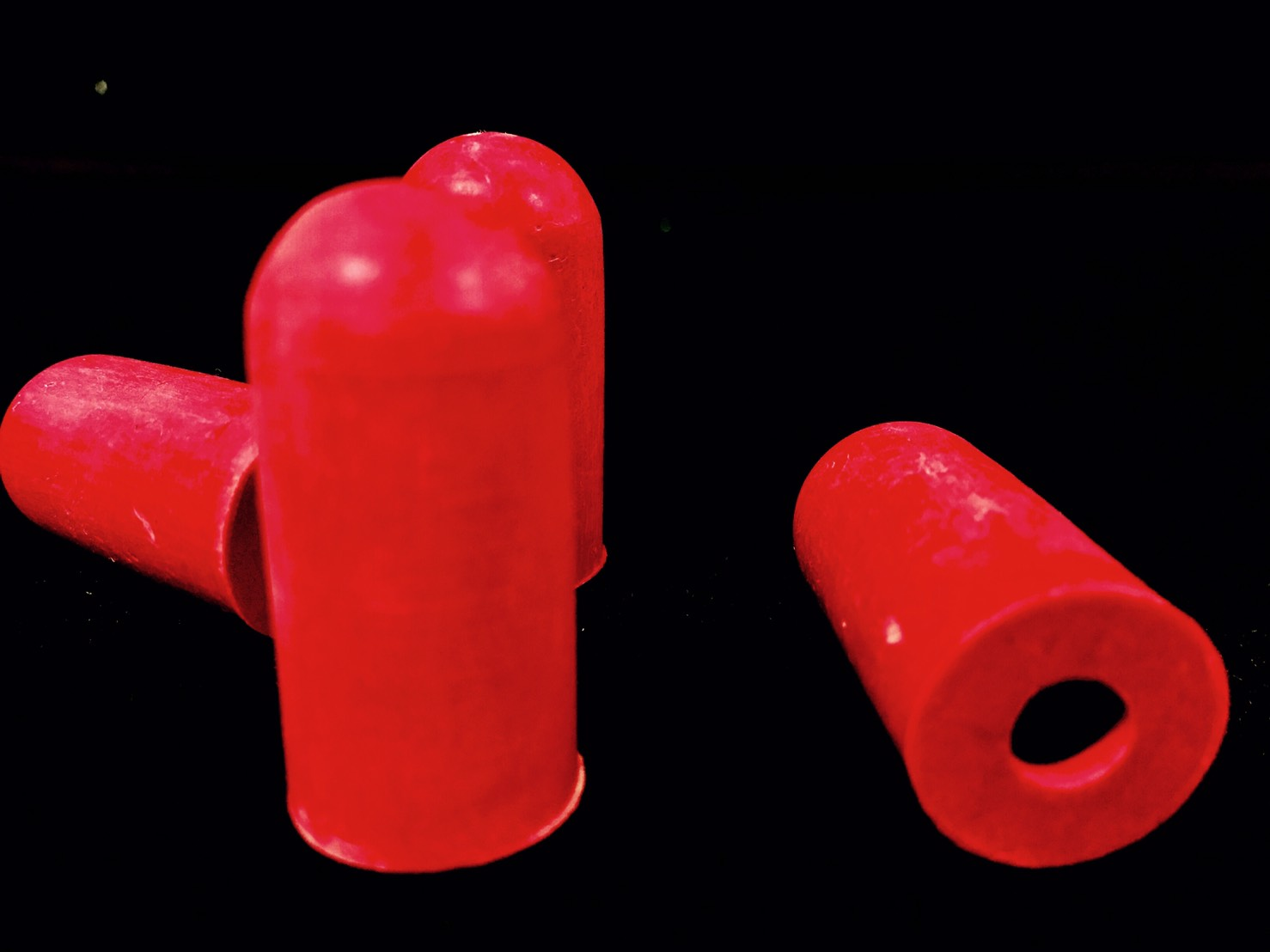
Pipette bulb

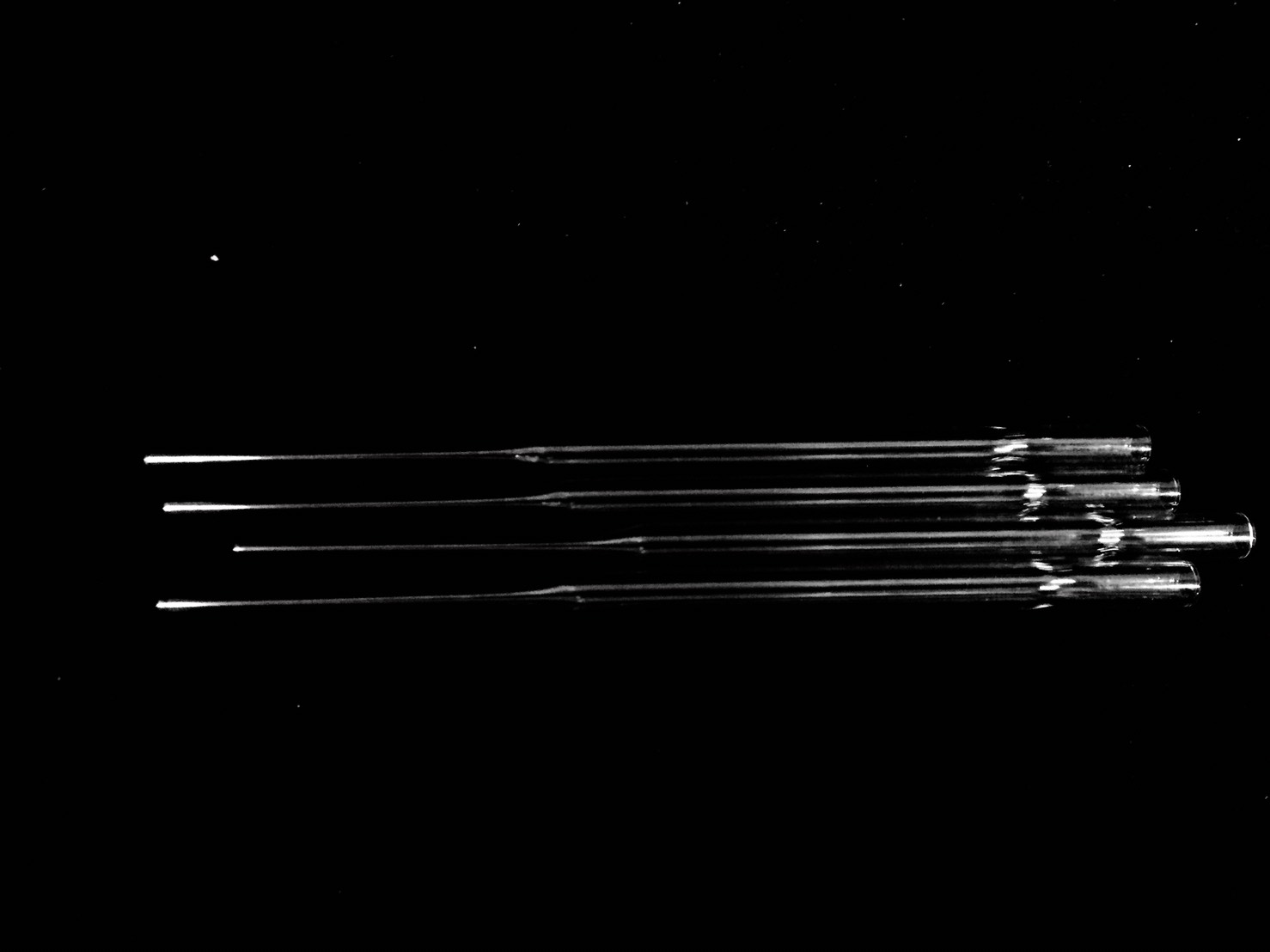
Pipette glass tube

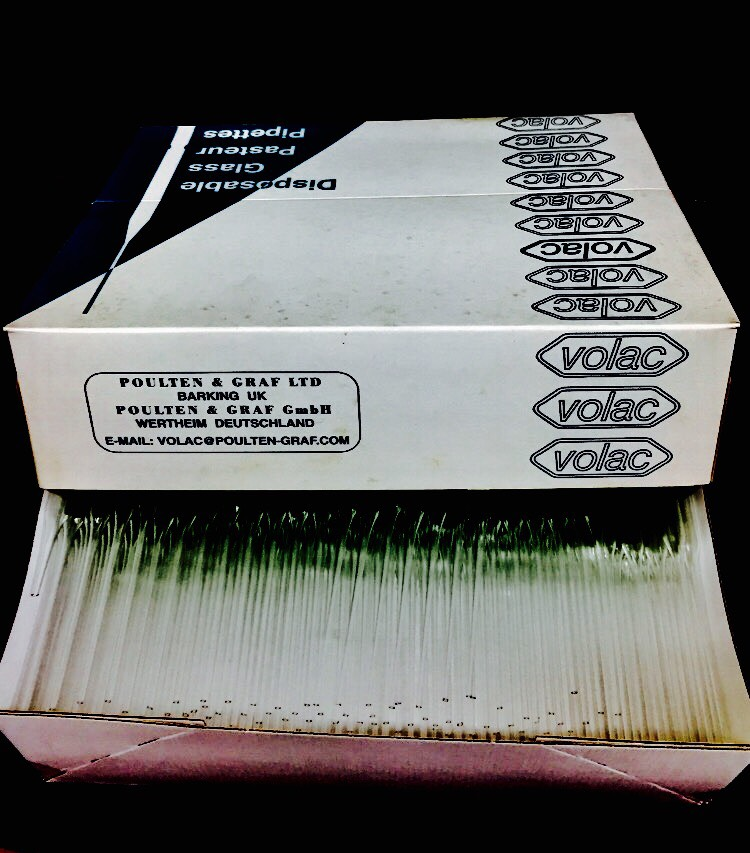
Pipette container

== See also ==
- Pipette
