= Clustermarket =

Lab management system

Calira
- Developer: Clustermarket Ltd. t/a Calira
- Release: 2015
- Type: Lab Management System (LMS)
- Website: calira.co

Calira (formerly known as Bookkit and Clustermarket) is a lab management system released in 2015.

== History ==
Calira, an LMS software, was released in 2015 by three Hult International Business School alumni, Niklas Friedberg, Tobias Wingbermuehle and Johannes Solzbach, developed by Clustermarket Ltd trading as Calira. The company started with the partnership of Merck Accelerator. In June 2018, Clustermarket was selected as one of the six companies to win Scalable Business Awards (SBAs) by the Imperial College ThinkSpace.

In August 2019, Start Codon, a UK based life sciences accelerator system announced its partnership with Calira. Calira would provide Start Codon's clients with a guided access to its online equipment sharing platform. In 2019, Calira developed and launched a cloud-based laboratory equipment booking and management system for R&D labs called Bookkit, which was later rebranded to Clustermarket and then Calira.

In March 2022, TetraScience's Tetra Partner Network partnered with Calira to develop of modern digital laboratory tools and to combine ELNs and LIMSs into one system.

In September 2022, the German laboratories equipment production company Eppendorf made a deal with eLabNext (now SciSure) and Calira, which enabled Eppendorf to transmit laboratory instrument data in the proper context and further the all-encompassing philosophy of its own digital platform, VisioNize Lab Suite.

Calira has also worked with RebelBio, GE HealthCare, and Cambridge Science Park.

== Overview ==
Research teams are given a software solution by Calira that enables them to coordinate the use of equipment, schedule maintenance tasks, and produce reports and projections for resource planning.

Calira is cloud-based laboratory management software for R&D laboratories in academia and industry (formerly known as Bookkit and Clustermarket). The equipment scheduling software allows managing multiple instruments, users, labs, and departments and have other features like equipment scheduling, instrument access management, maintenance management, asset monitoring, reporting & analytics, and real-time usage tracking through desktop app called LabTrack.

== Awards and honors ==
- 2017 - Top 20 Startups - MassChallenge UK Awards
- 2016 - Top 100 Startups - MassChallenge UK
- 2018 - Scalable Business Awards - Imperial College ThinkSpace
- 2021 - Company of the Month - MedCity
