= Pipette =

Liquid-transferring laboratory tool

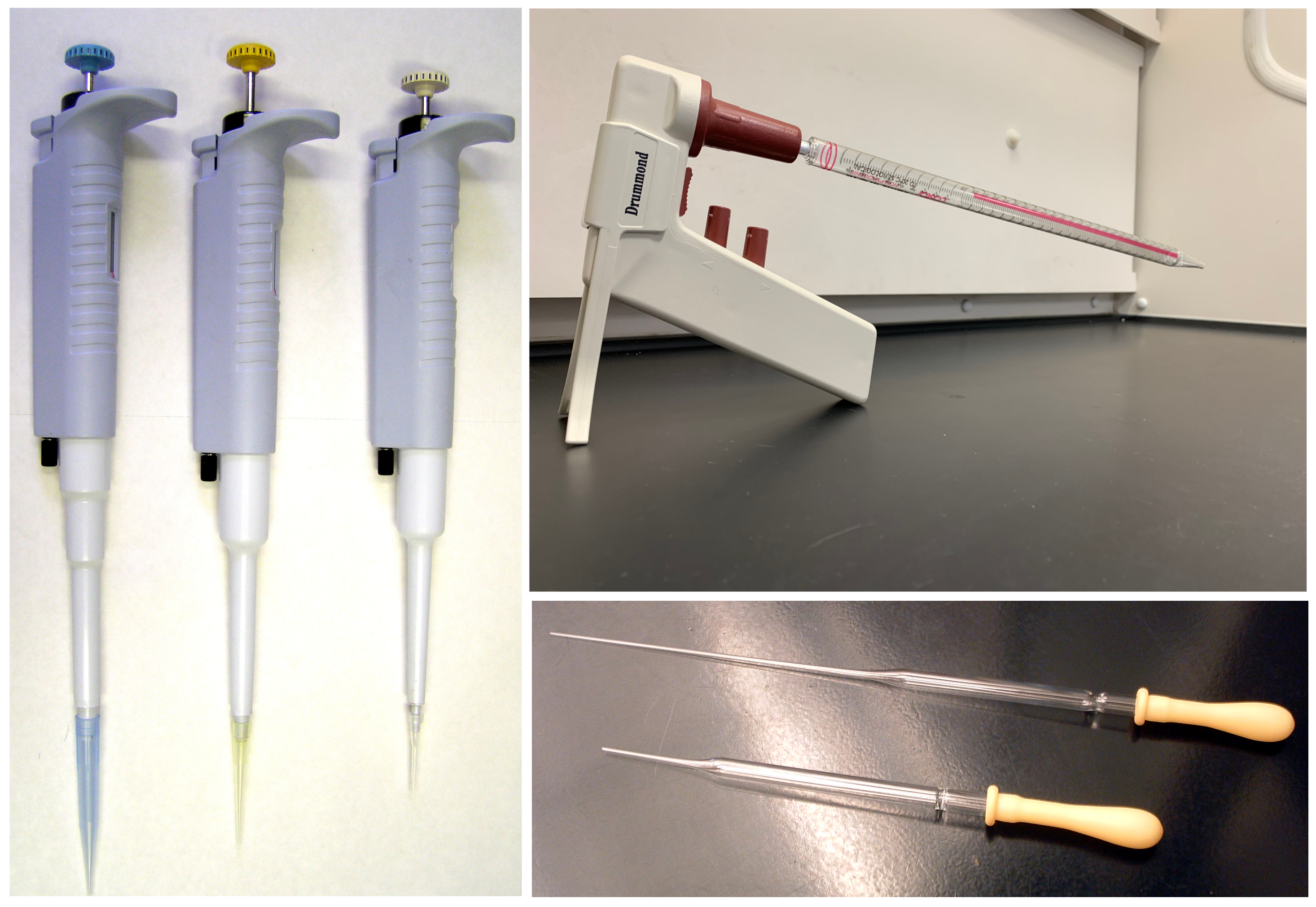
- Clockwise from top left: various sizes of micropipettes; a graduated serological pipette attached to an electronic manual pipetter; two Pasteur pipettes.
- Classification: Media dispenser
- Uses: Volume measurement, liquid transfer
- Used with: Plastic disposable tips; Dispenser

A pipette, or pipet, is a type of laboratory tool commonly used in chemistry and biology to transport a measured volume of liquid, often as a media dispenser. Pipettes come in several designs for various purposes with differing levels of accuracy and precision, from single piece glass pipettes to more complex adjustable or electronic pipettes. Many pipette types work by creating a partial vacuum above the liquid-holding chamber and selectively releasing this vacuum to draw up and dispense liquid. Measurement accuracy varies greatly depending on the instrument.

== History ==
The first simple pipettes were made of glass, such as Pasteur pipettes. Large pipettes continue to be made of glass; others are made of squeezable plastic for situations where an exact volume is not required.

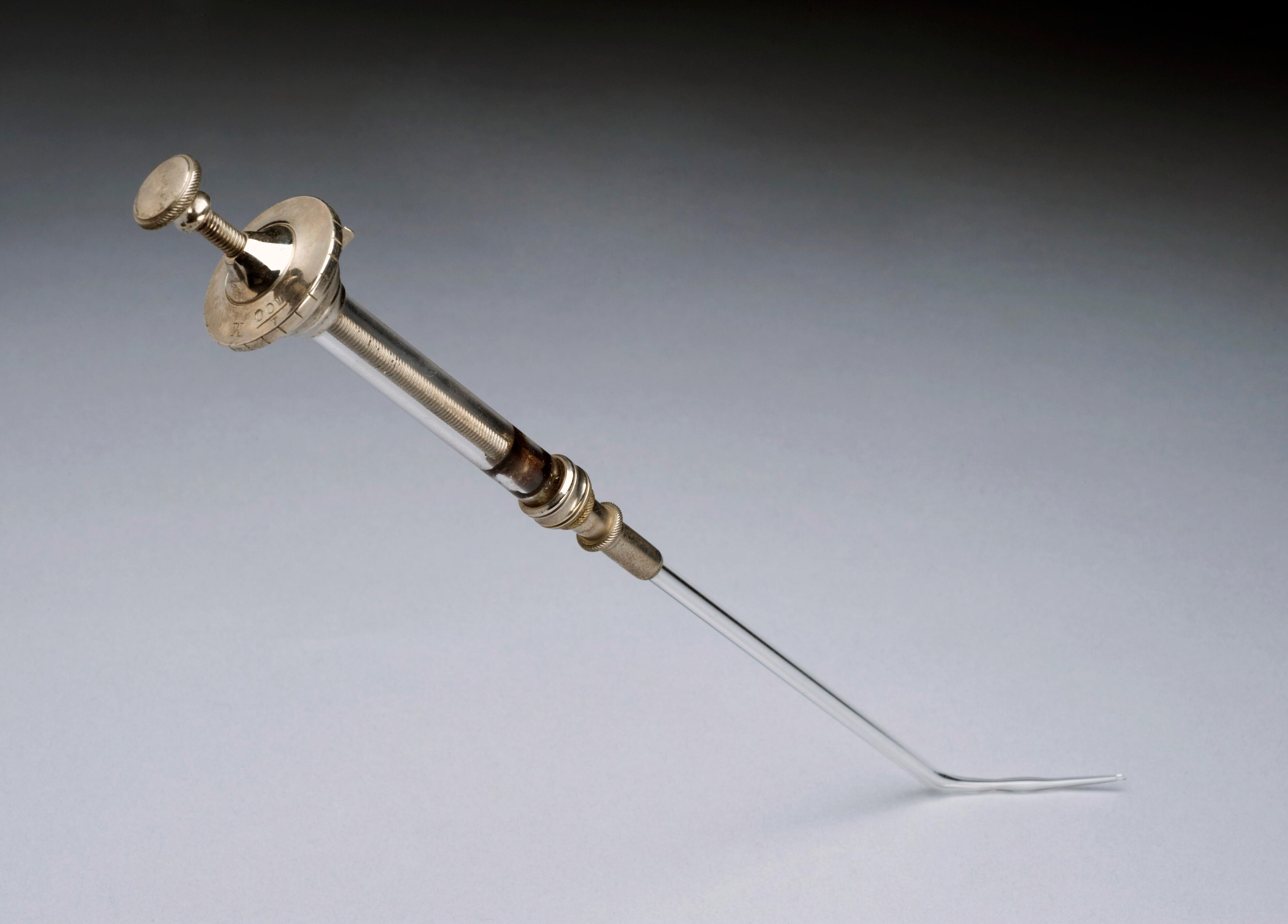
Micro-pipette used by Lister that dispensed a bacterial solution diluted to contain an average of "rather less than one bacterium" per drop

During or prior to 1877, Joseph Lister (1827 – 1912) invented the first adjustable micropipette, consisting of a "pipette with a syringe" (photograph shown at right).

"...by means of this little syringe with a graduated disc and a piston rod in the form of a screw, graduated 2-100ths of a minim, by which means you can, with perfect precision, unit 1-100th of a minim, or 2-100ths, or any number you choose."

The micropipette was patented in 1957 by Dr Heinrich Schnitger (Marburg, Germany). The founder of the company Eppendorf, Dr. Heinrich Netheler, inherited the rights and started the commercial production of micropipettes in 1961.

The modern adjustable micropipette is a Wisconsin invention developed through interactions among several people, primarily inventor Warren Gilson and Henry Lardy, a professor of biochemistry at the University of Wisconsin–Madison.

In 1984, Mettler-Toledo Rainin introduced one of the first commercially available electronic pipettes, contributing to the adoption of electronically controlled liquid handling in laboratory workflows.

== Nomenclature ==
Although specific names exist for each type of pipette, in practice, any type can be referred to as a "pipette". Pipettes that dispense less than 1000 μL are sometimes distinguished as micropipettes.

The terms "pipette" and "pipet" are used interchangeably despite minor historical differences in their usage.

== Common pipettes ==
=== Air displacement micropipettes ===
Air displacement micropipettes are a type of adjustable micropipette that deliver a measured volume of liquid; depending on size, it could be between about 0.1 μL to 1,000 μL (1 mL). These pipettes require disposable tips that come in contact with the fluid.

These pipettes operate by piston-driven air displacement. A vacuum is generated by the vertical travel of a metal or ceramic piston within an airtight sleeve. As the piston moves upward, driven by the depression of the plunger, a vacuum is created in the space left vacant by the piston. The liquid around the tip moves into this vacuum (along with the air in the tip) and can then be transported and released as necessary. These pipettes are capable of being very precise and accurate. However, since they rely on air displacement, they are subject to inaccuracies caused by the changing environment, particularly temperature and user technique. For these reasons, this equipment must be carefully maintained and calibrated, and users must be trained to exercise correct and consistent technique.

The first verified adjustable air displacement micropipette was invented by Joseph Lister during or prior to 1877 (see History section above). The modern micropipette was patented in 1960 by Dr. Heinrich Schnitger in Marburg, Germany. Afterwards, the co-founder of the biotechnology company Eppendorf, Dr. Heinrich Netheler, inherited the rights and initiated the global and general use of micropipettes in labs. In 1972, the modern adjustable micropipette was invented at the University of Wisconsin-Madison by several people, primarily Warren Gilson and Henry Lardy.

Types of air displacement pipettes include:

- adjustable or fixed
- volume handled
- Single-channel, multi-channel or repeater
- conical tips or cylindrical tips
- standard or locking
- manual or electronic
- manufacturer

Irrespective of brand or expense of pipette, every micropipette manufacturer recommends checking the calibration at least every six months, if used regularly. Companies in the drug or food industries are required to calibrate their pipettes quarterly (every three months). Schools which are conducting chemistry classes can have this process annually. Those studying forensics and research where a great deal of testing is commonplace will perform monthly calibrations.

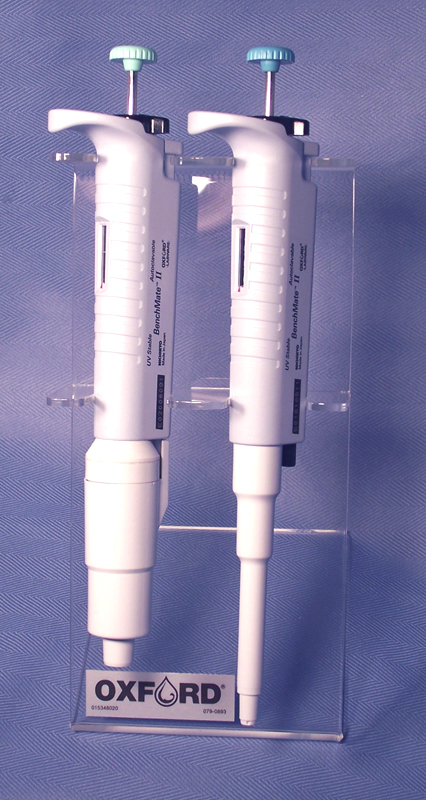
Single-Channel Pipettes designed to handle 1–5 ml and 100–1000 μL with locking system

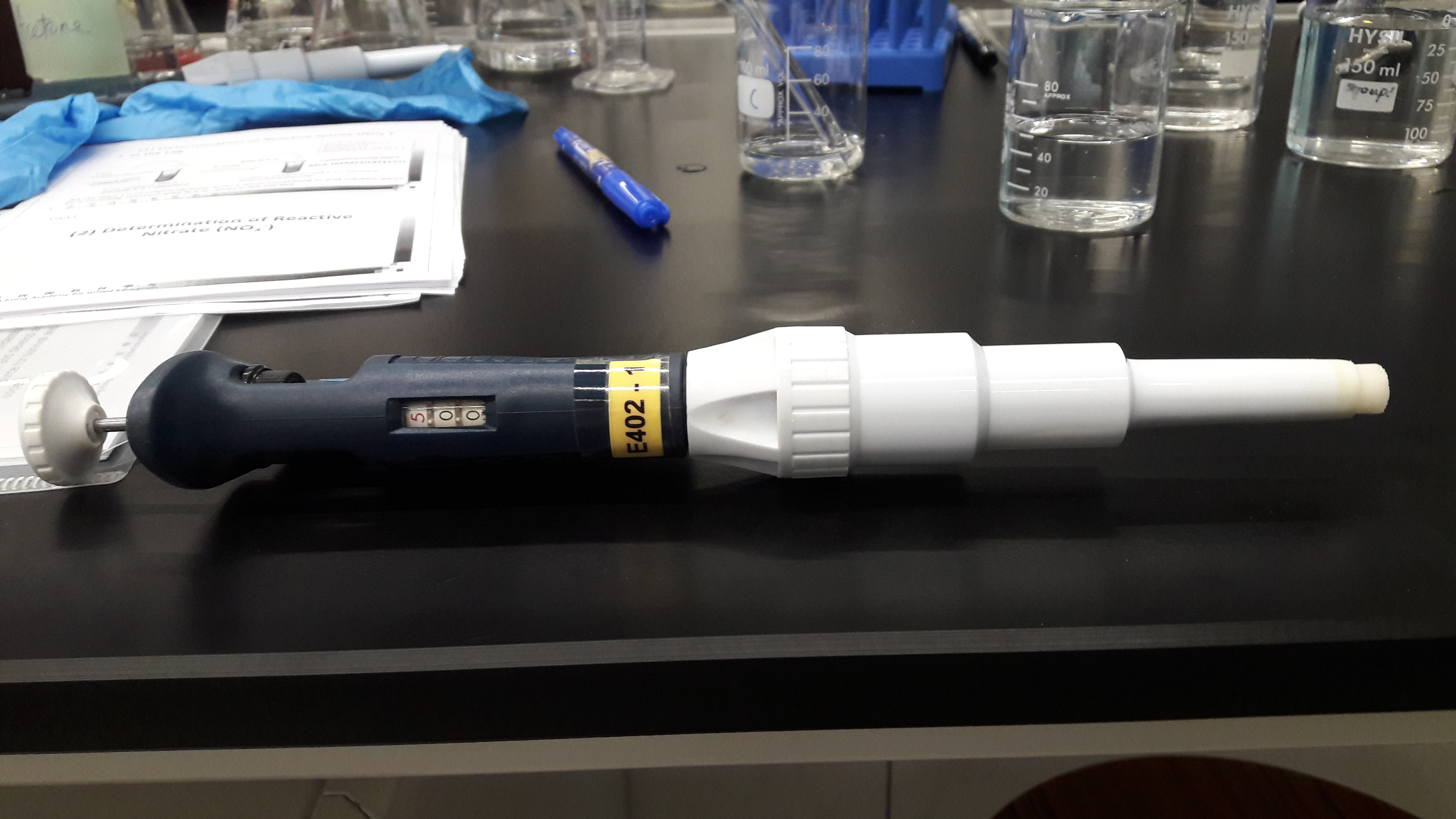
A 5,000 μL (5 mL) pipette, with the volume to be transferred indicated. 500 means that the amount transferred is 5,000 μL.

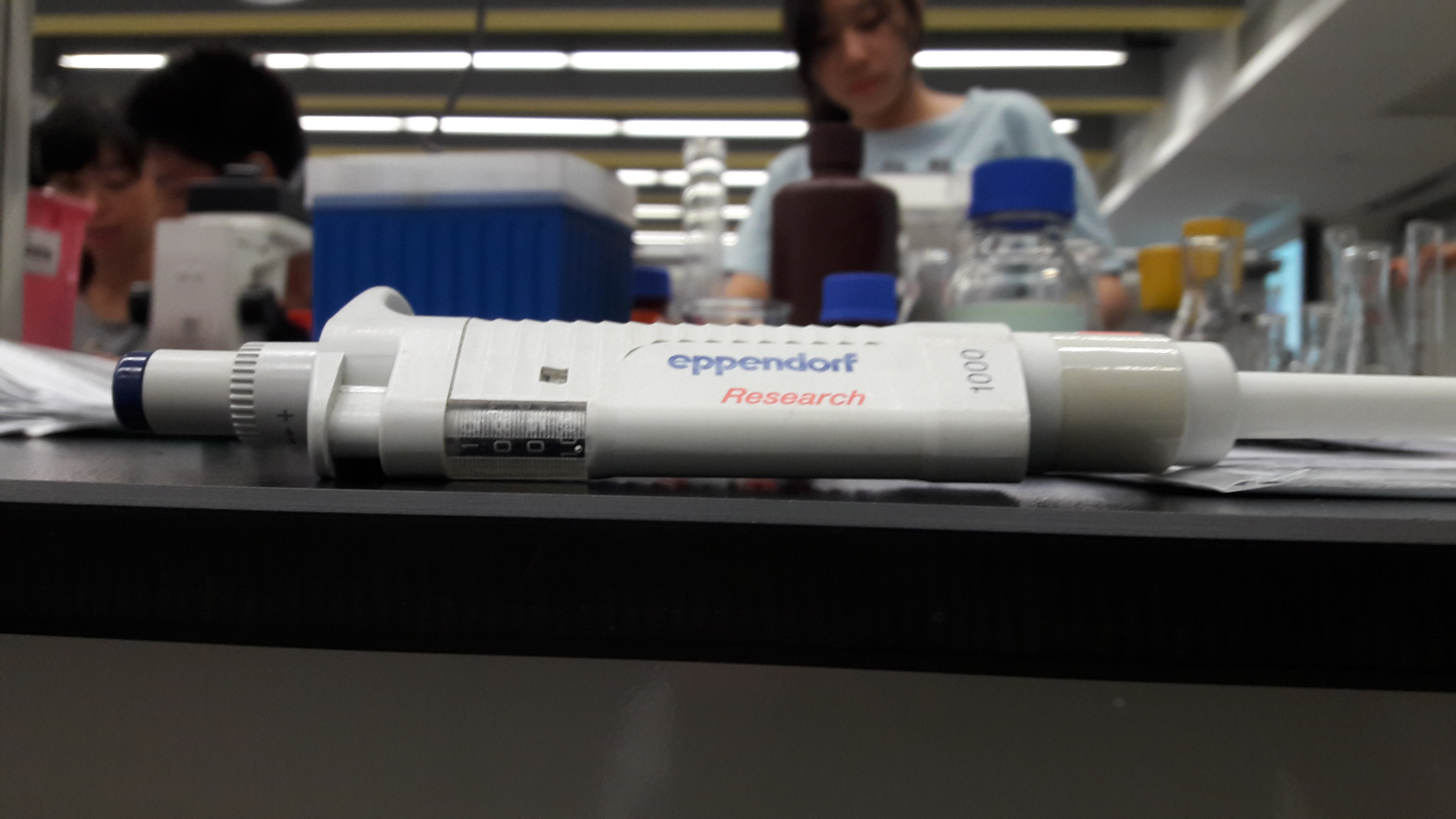
A 1,000 μL (1 mL) pipette, with the volume to be transferred indicated.

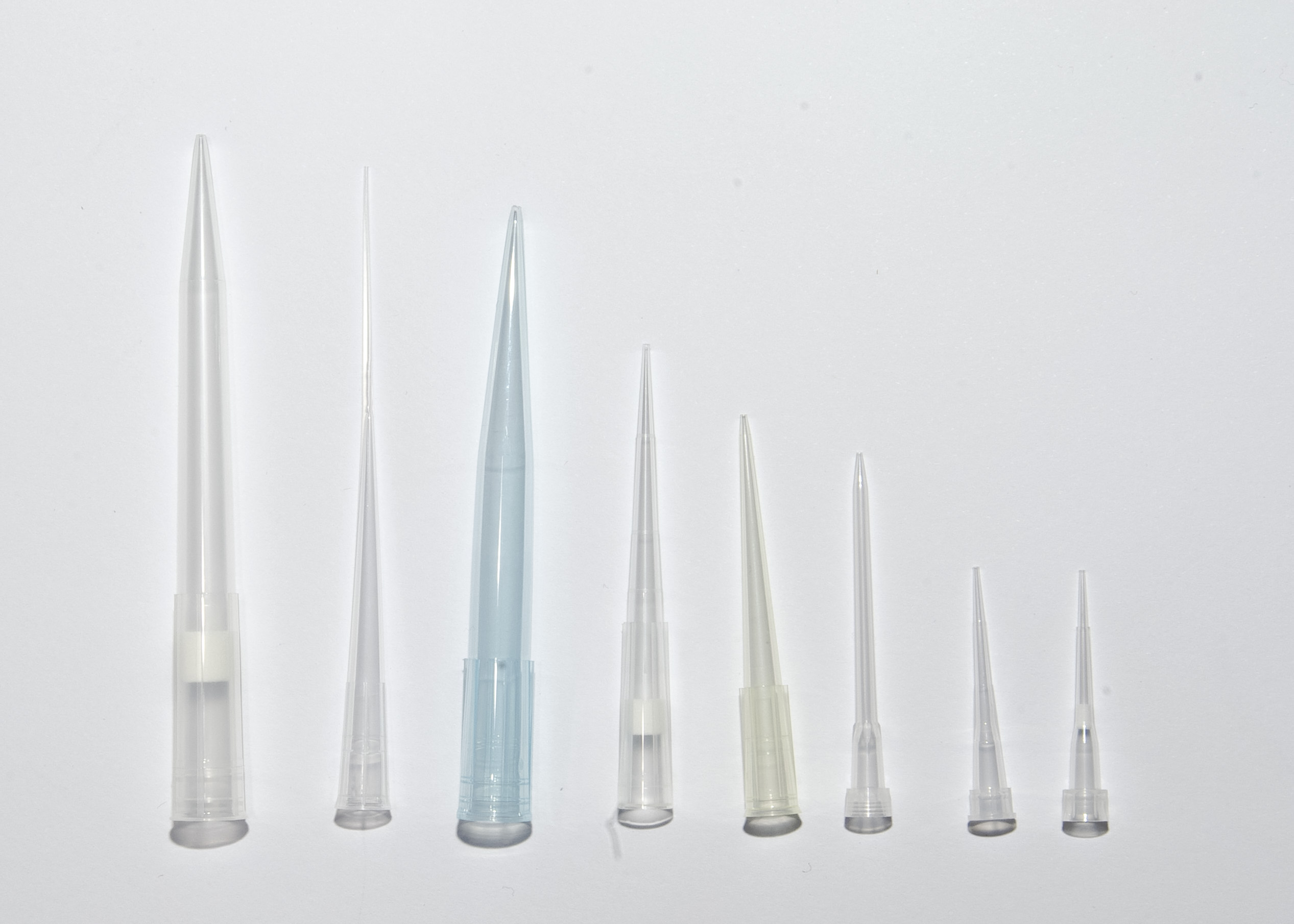
A variety of pipette tips.

==== Electronic pipette ====
To minimize the possible development of musculoskeletal disorders due to repetitive pipetting, electronic pipettes commonly replace the mechanical version.

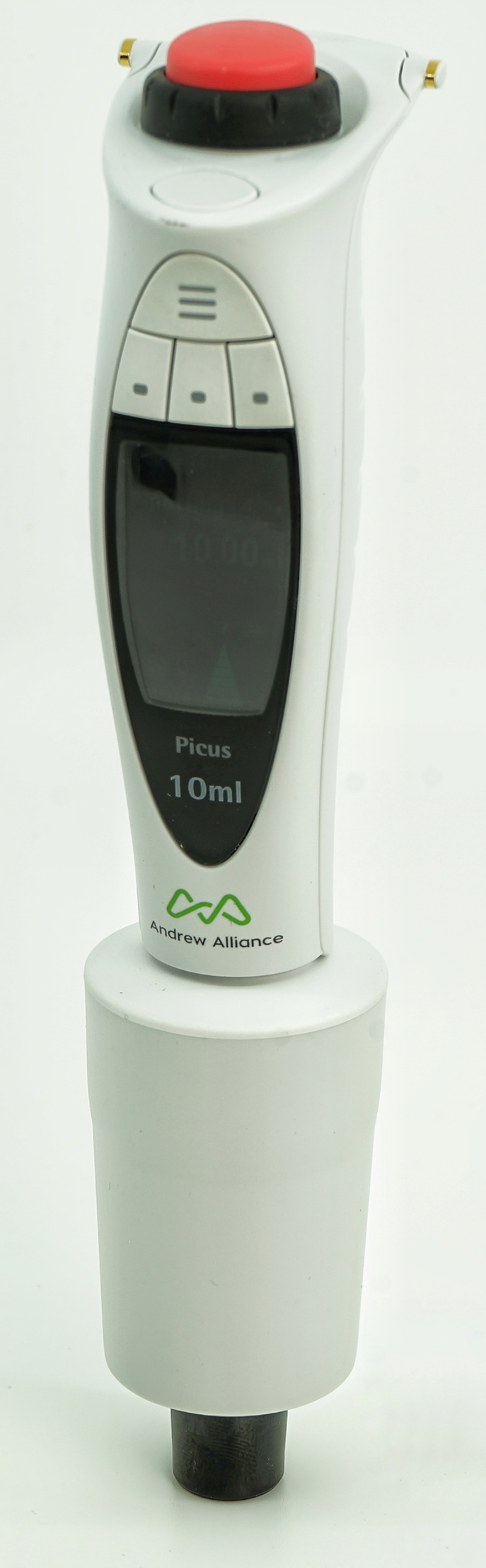
Single-Channel Electronic Pipettes designed to handle 0.5–10ml

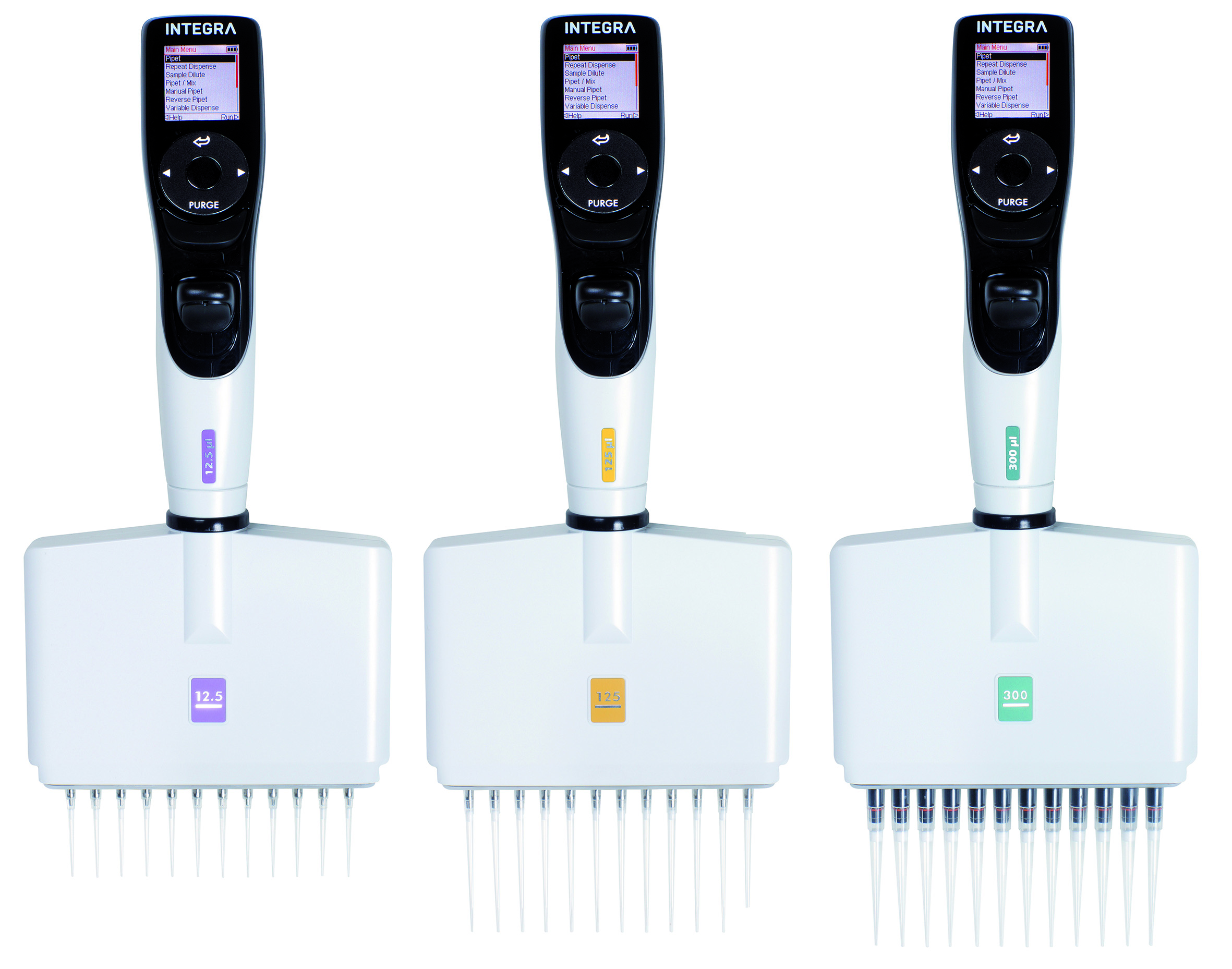
VIAFLO electronic multichannel pipettes from INTEGRA Biosciences

=== Positive displacement pipette ===
These are similar to air displacement pipettes, but are less commonly used and are used to avoid contamination and for volatile or viscous substances at small volumes, such as DNA. The major difference is that the disposable tip is a microsyringe (plastic), composed of a capillary and a piston (movable inner part) which directly displaces the liquid.

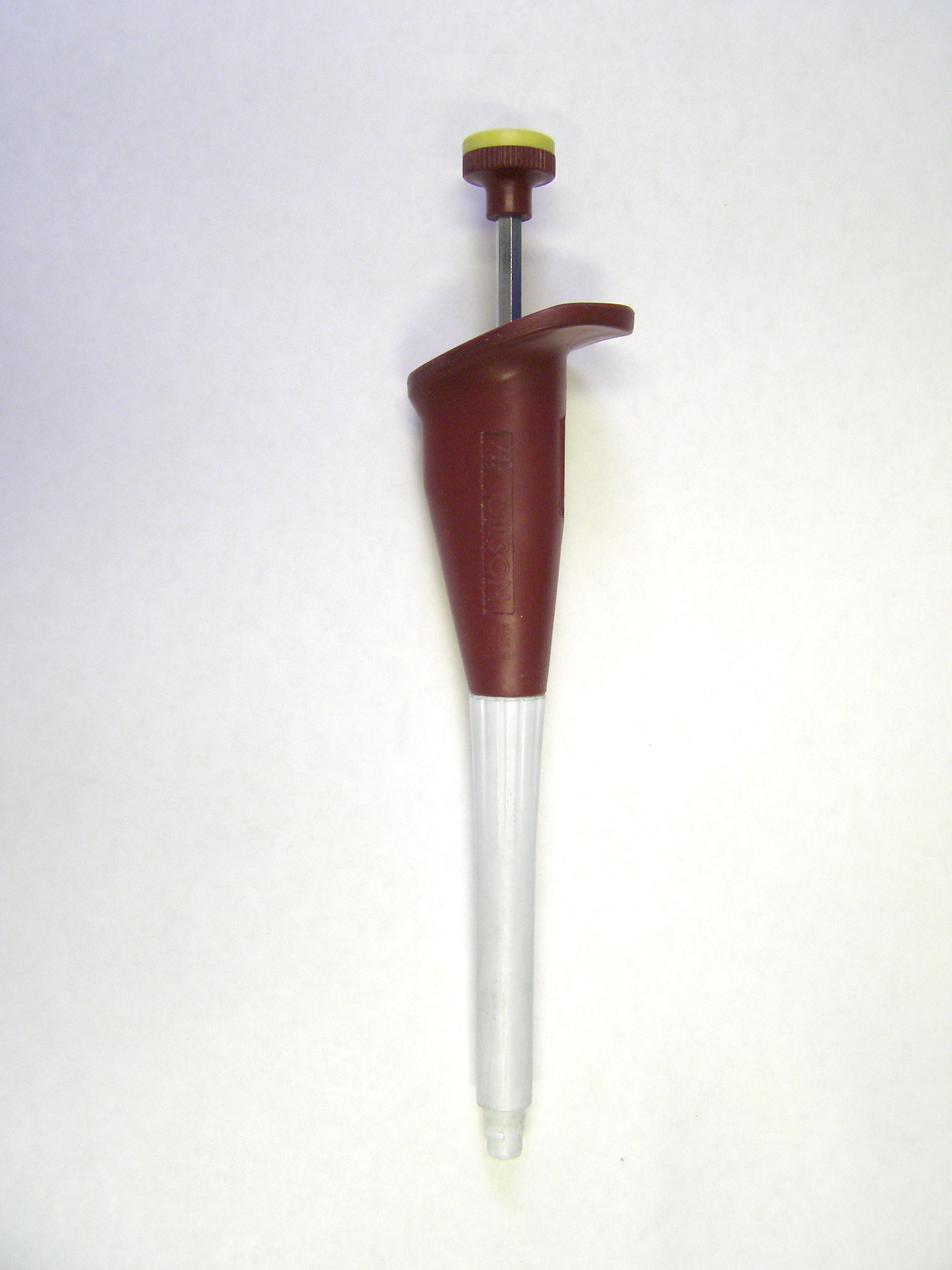
Positive displacement pipette

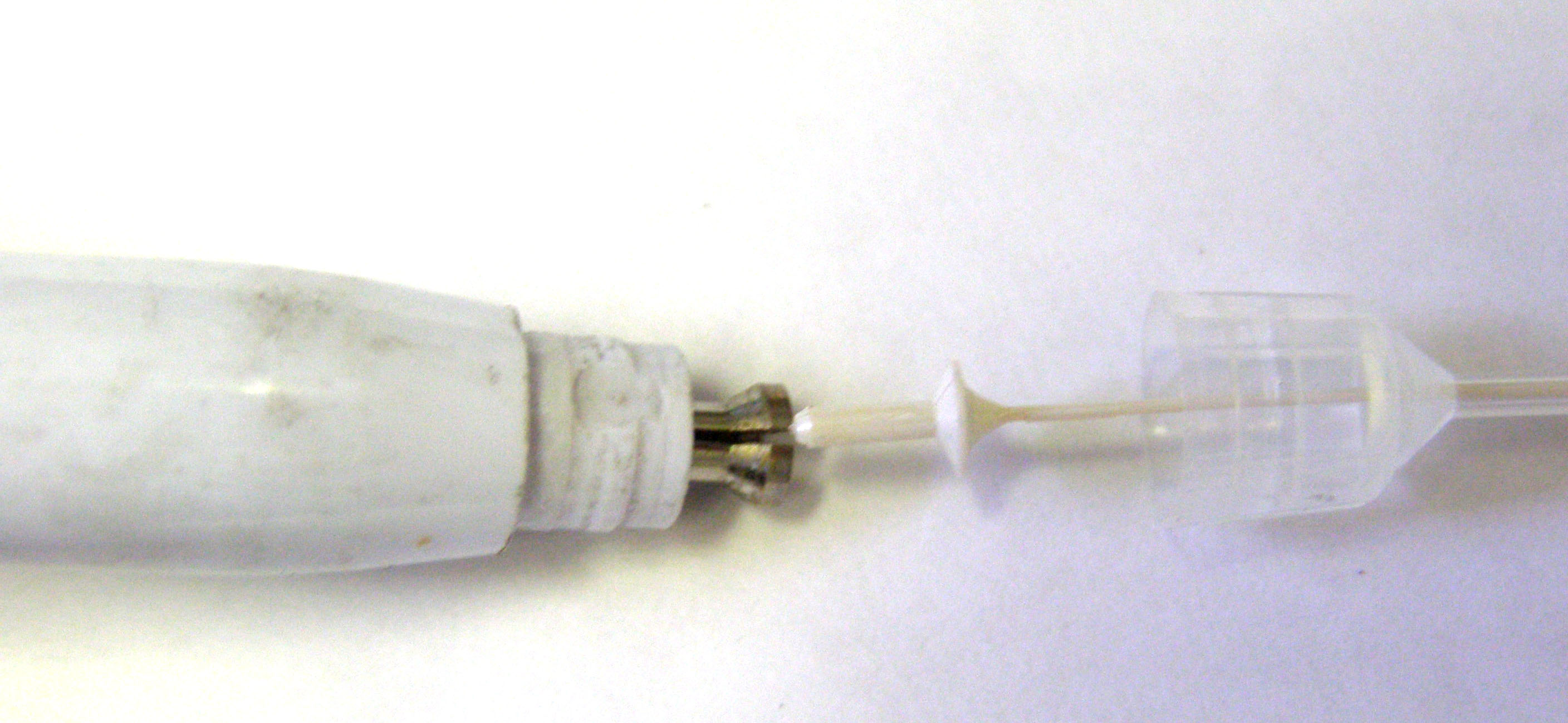
The chuck which will be used to move the plunger

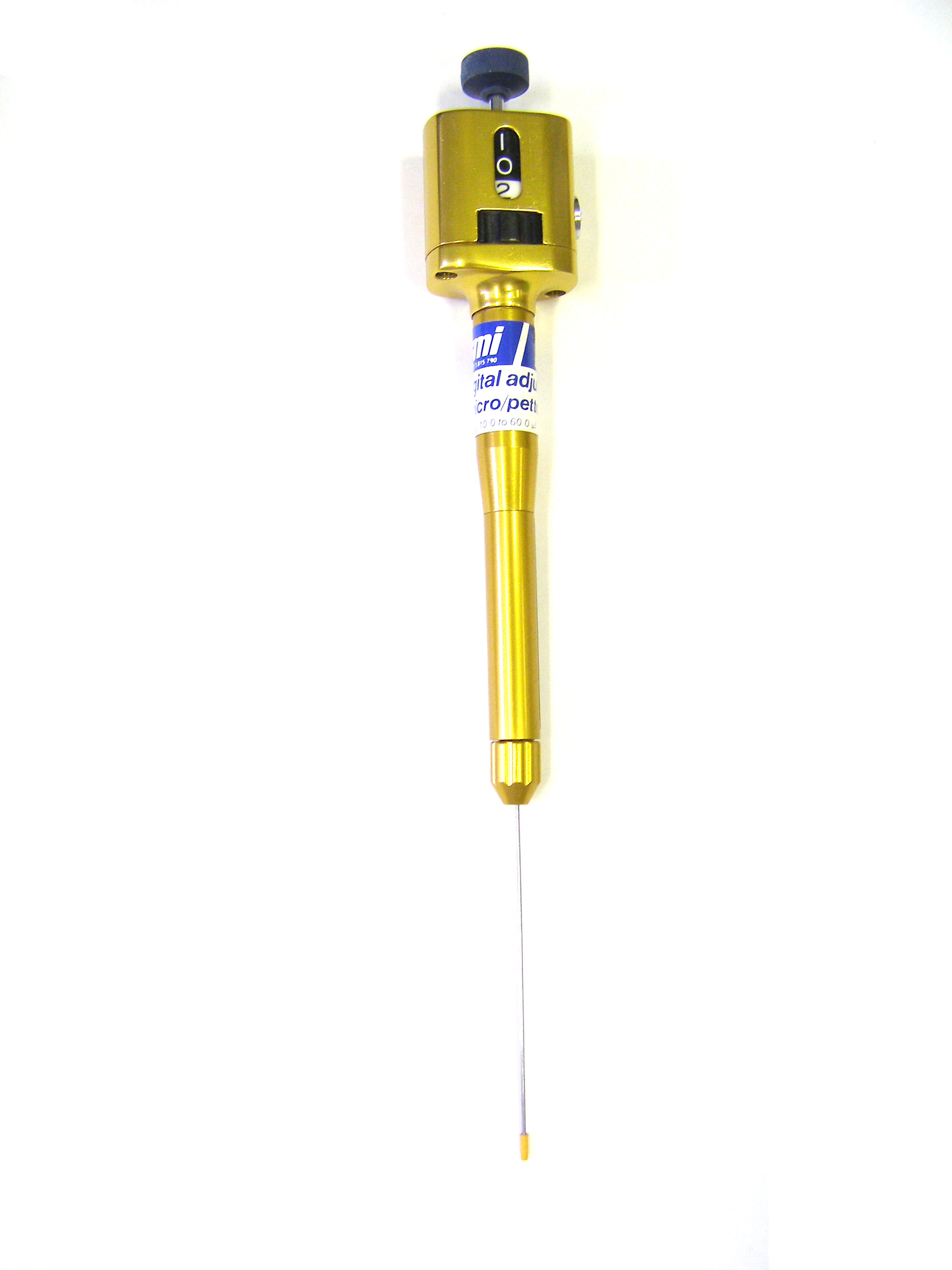
An early pipette

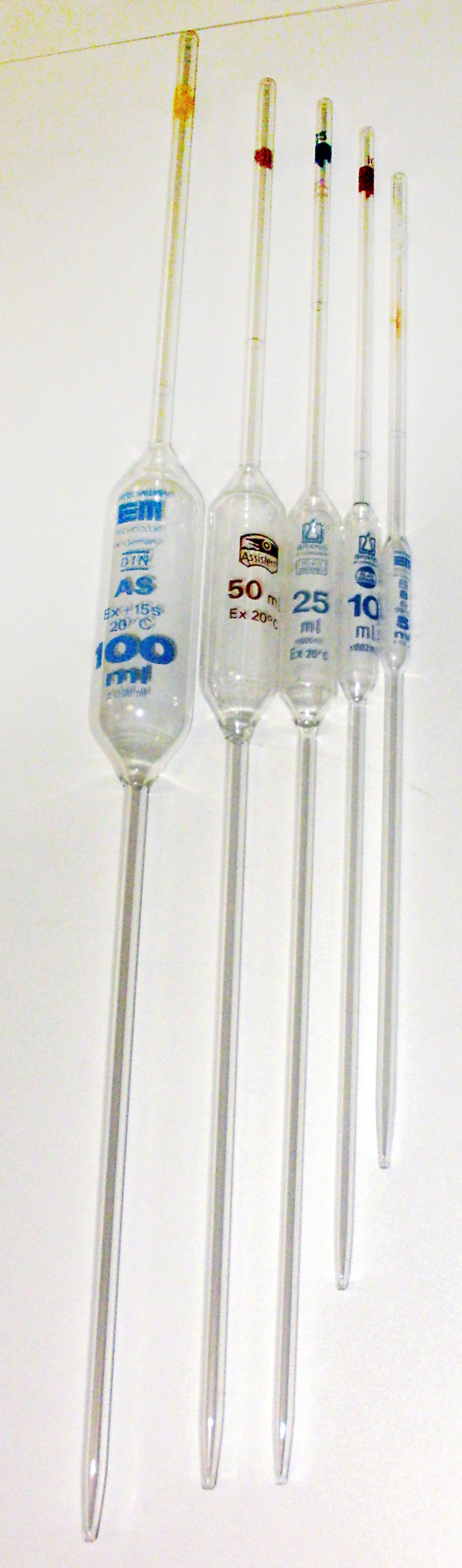
Several sizes of volumetric pipette.

=== Volumetric pipettes ===
Volumetric pipettes or bulb pipette allow the user to measure a volume of solution extremely precisely (precision of four significant figures). These pipettes have a large bulb with a long narrow portion above with a single graduation mark as it is calibrated for a single volume (like a volumetric flask). Typical volumes are 20, 50, and 100 mL. Volumetric pipettes are commonly used to make laboratory solutions from a base stock as well as prepare solutions for titration.

=== Graduated pipettes ===
Graduated pipettes are a type of macropipette consisting of a long tube with a series of graduations, as on a graduated cylinder or burette, to indicate different calibrated volumes. They also require a source of vacuum; in the early days of chemistry and biology, the mouth was used. The safety regulations included the statement: "Never pipette by mouth KCN, NH3, strong acids, bases and mercury salts". Some pipettes were manufactured with two bubbles between the mouth piece and the solution level line, to protect the chemist from accidental swallowing of the solution.

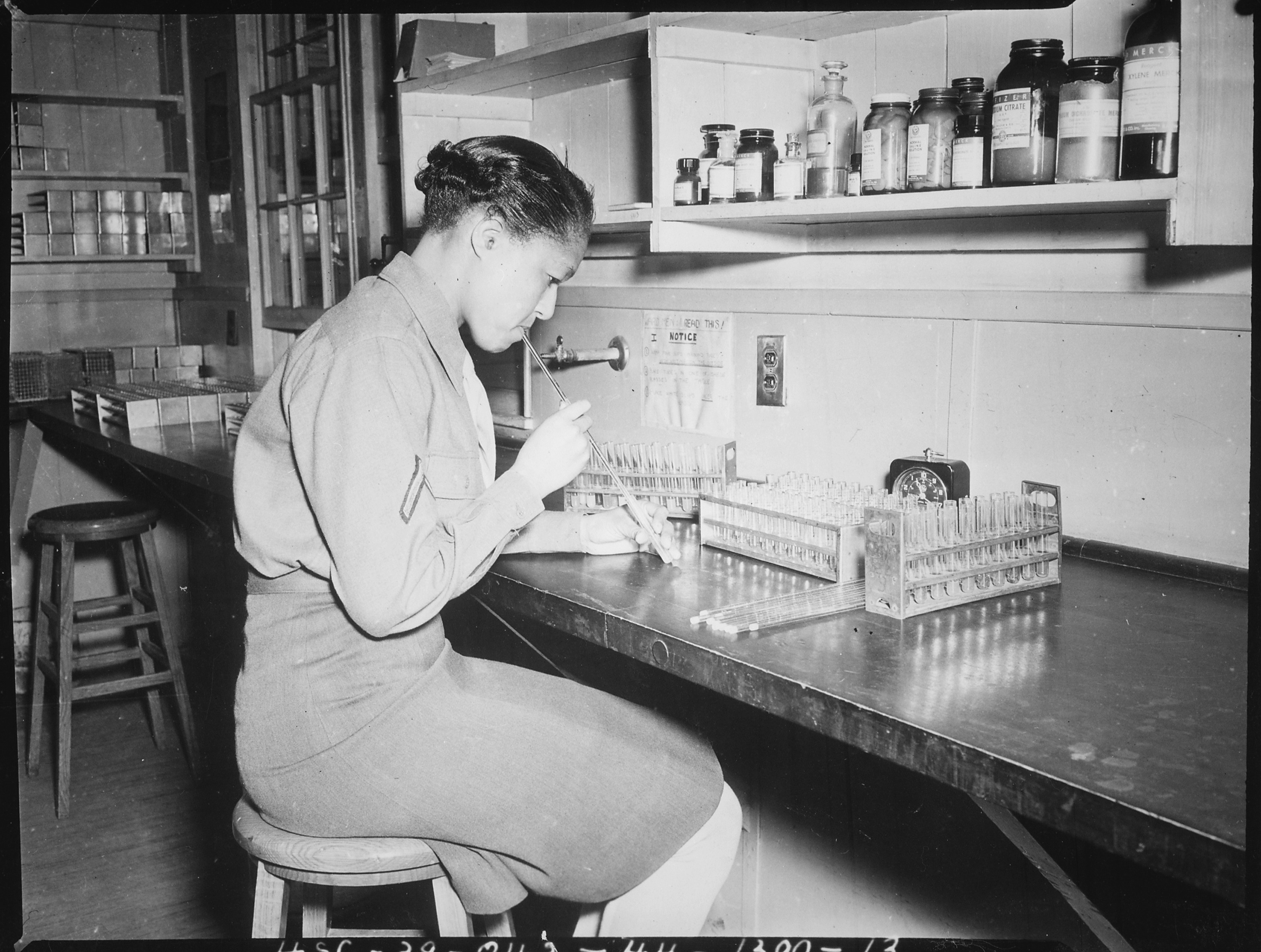
A person pipetting by mouth, now considered an unsafe practice

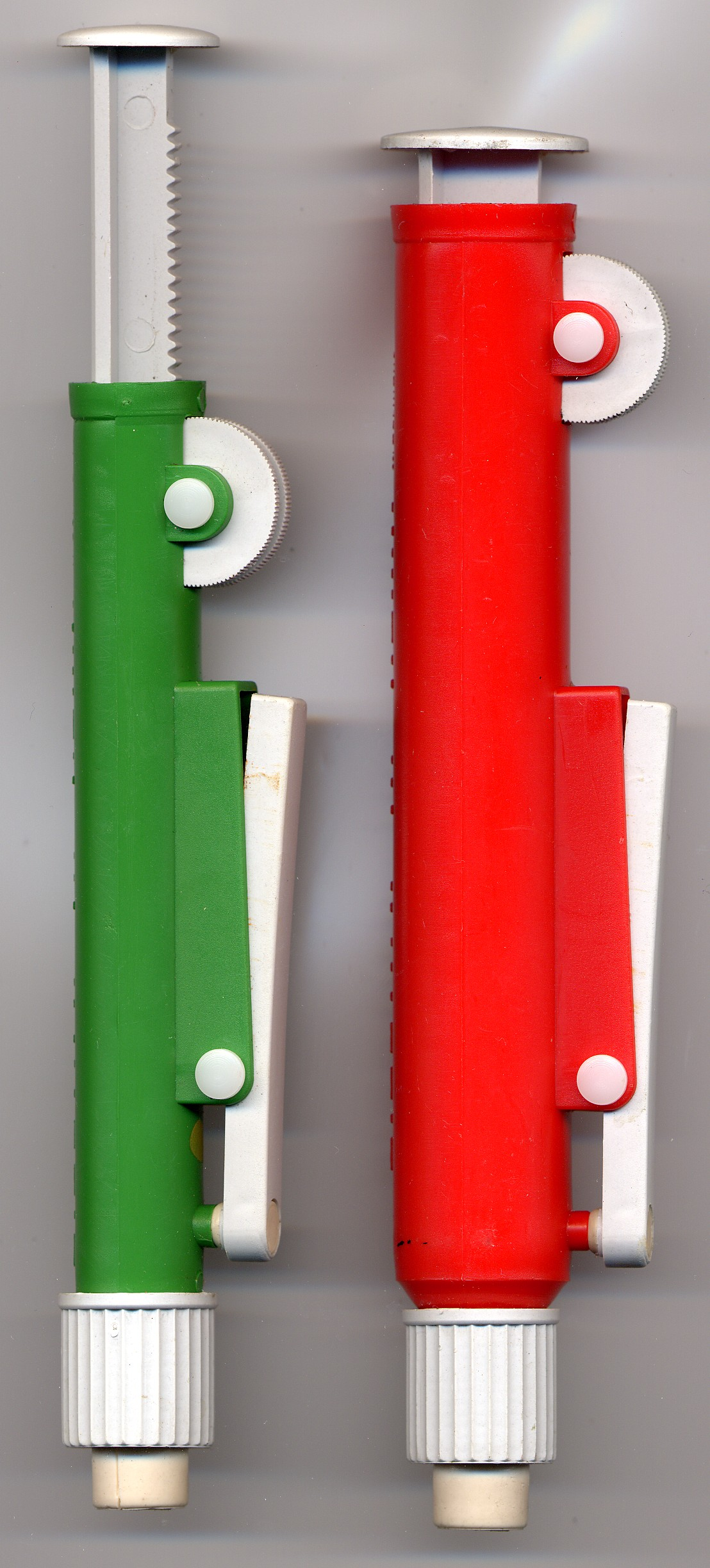
A manual propipetter adjusted by turning the wheel with the thumb

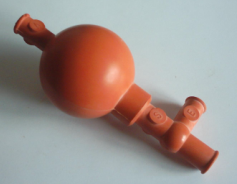
A manual propipetter adjusted by squeezing the valves marked E and S

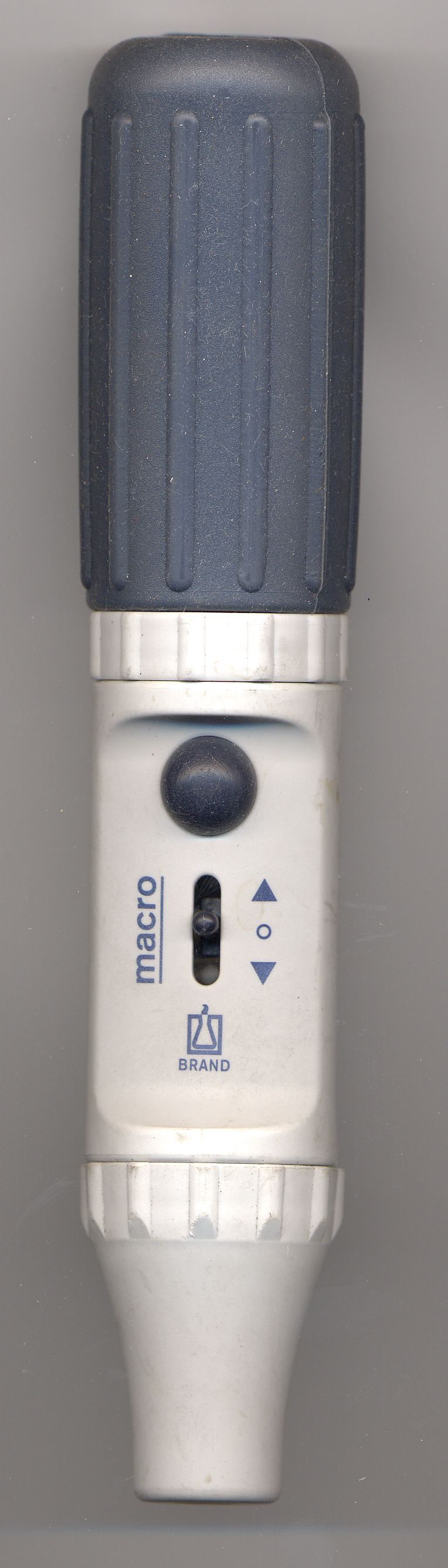
An automatic propipetter adjusted by pressing the button and toggling the switch

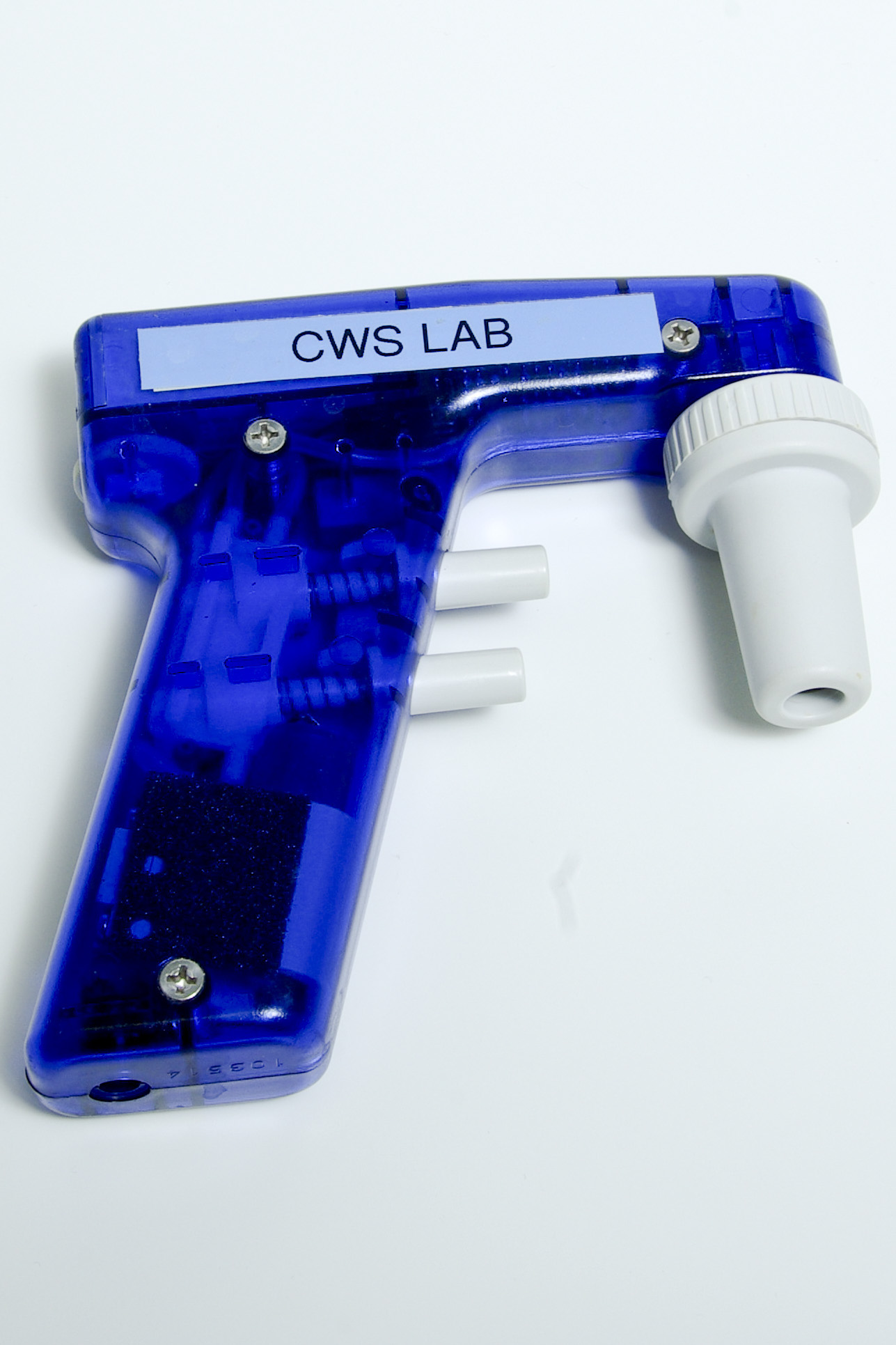
An automatic propipetter adjusted by pulling and releasing the triggers

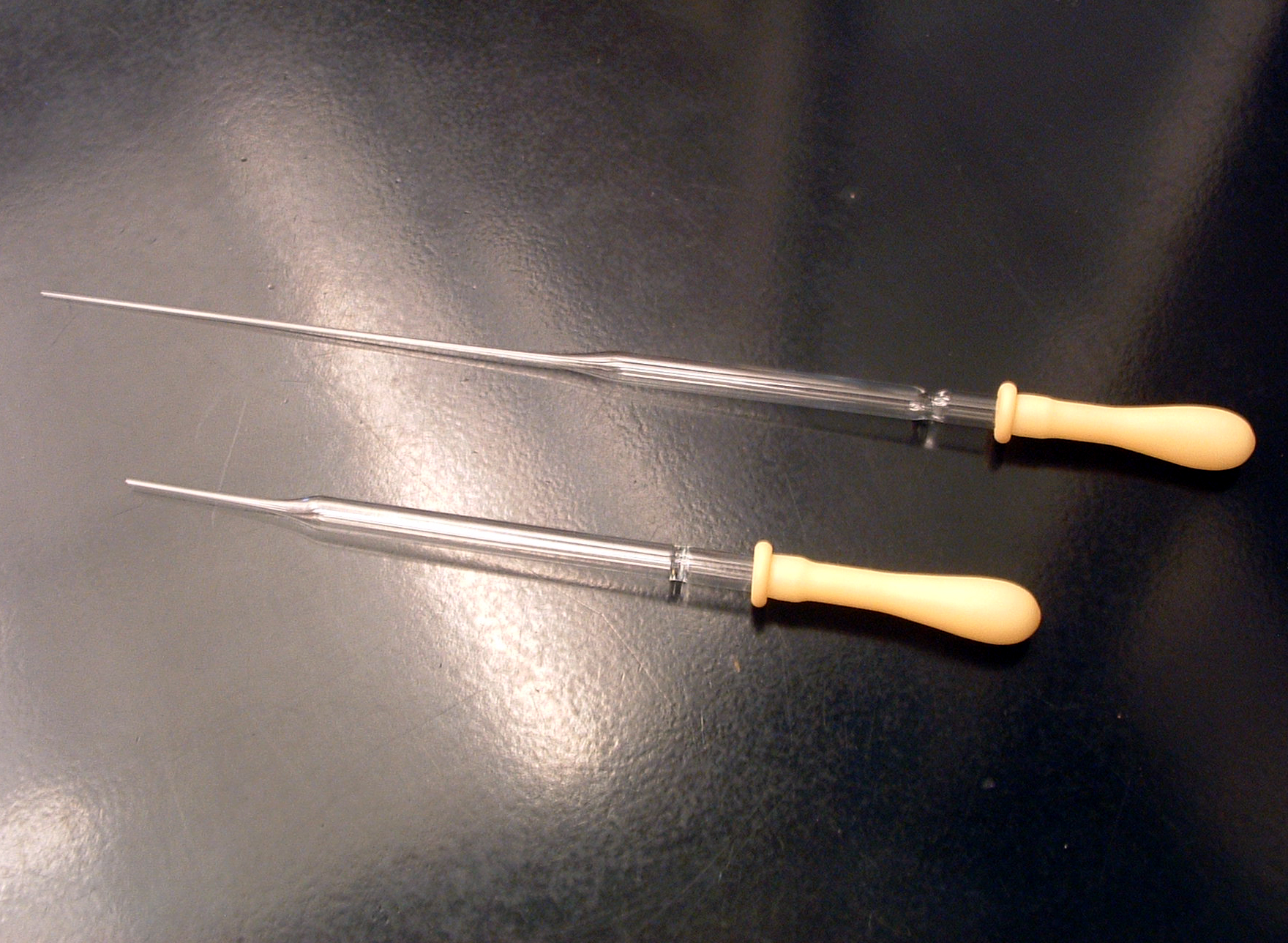
Pasteur pipettes with rubber bulbs attached.

=== Pasteur pipette ===
Pasteur pipettes are plastic or glass pipettes used to transfer small amounts of liquids, but are not graduated or calibrated for any particular volume. The bulb is separate from the pipette body. Pasteur pipettes are also called teat pipettes, droppers, eye droppers and chemical droppers.

=== Transfer pipettes ===
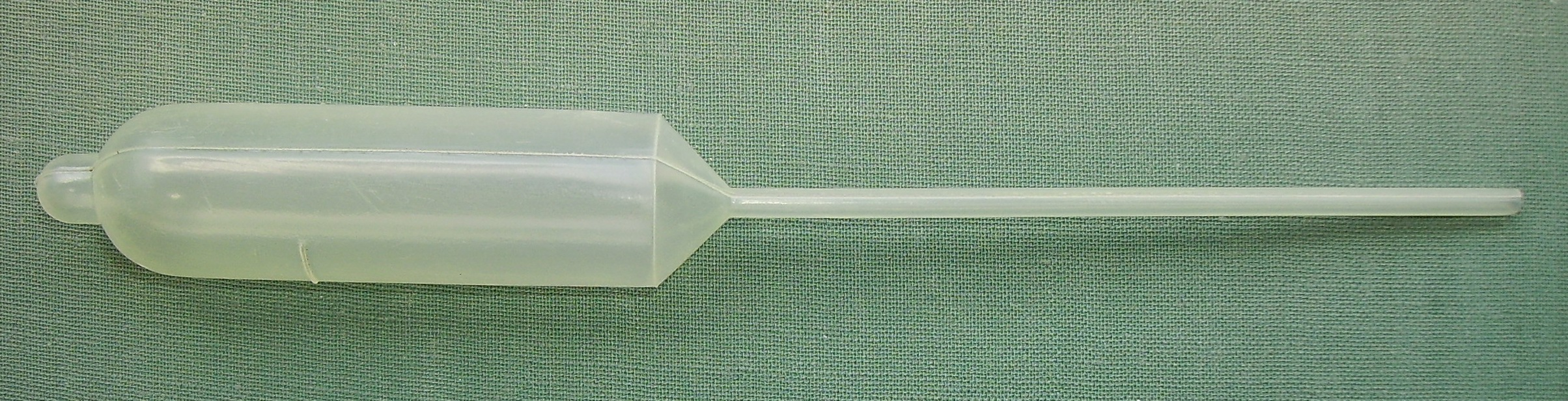
A transfer pipette

Transfer pipettes, also known as Beral pipettes, are similar to Pasteur pipettes but are made from a single piece of plastic and their bulb can serve as the liquid-holding chamber.

== Specialized pipettes ==
=== Pipetting syringe ===
Pipetting syringes are hand-held devices that combine the functions of volumetric (bulb) pipettes, graduated pipettes, and burettes. They are calibrated to ISO volumetric A grade standards. A glass or plastic pipette tube is used with a thumb-operated piston and PTFE seal which slides within the pipette in a positive displacement operation. Such a device can be used on a wide variety of fluids (aqueous, viscous, and volatile fluids; hydrocarbons; essential oils; and mixtures) in volumes between 0.5 mL and 25 mL. This arrangement provides improvements in precision, handling safety, reliability, economy, and versatility. No disposable tips or pipetting aids are needed with the pipetting syringe.

=== Van Slyke pipette ===
The Van Slyke pipette, invented by Donald Dexter Van Slyke, is a graduated pipette commonly used in medical technology with serologic pipettes for volumetric analysis.

=== Ostwald–Folin pipette ===
The Ostwald–Folin pipette, developed by Wilhelm Ostwald and refined by Otto Folin, is a type of volumetric pipette used to measure viscous fluids such as whole blood or serum.

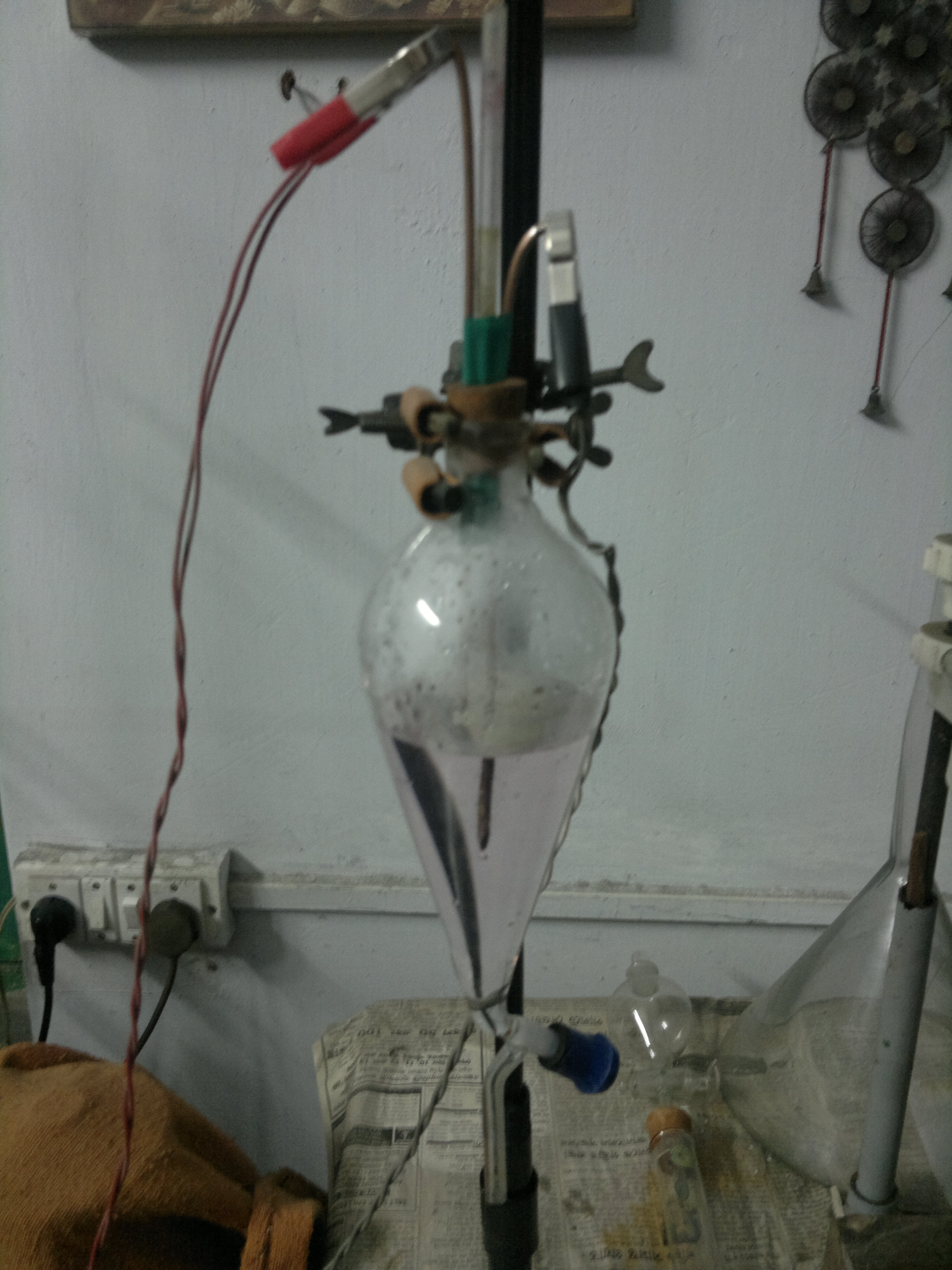
Combustion pipette

=== Winkler–Dennis gas combustion pipette ===
The Winkler–Dennis gas combustion pipette, developed by Clemens Winkler and refined by Louis Munroe Dennis, is an apparatus for the controlled reaction of liquids under a mild electric current and a supply of oxygen.

=== Glass micropipette ===
Glass micropipettes are fabricated in a micropipette puller and are typically used in a micromanipulator. These are used to physically interact with microscopic samples, such as in the procedures of microinjection and patch clamping. Most micropipettes are made of borosilicate, aluminosilicate or quartz with many types and sizes of glass tubing being available. Each of these compositions has unique properties which will determine suitable applications.

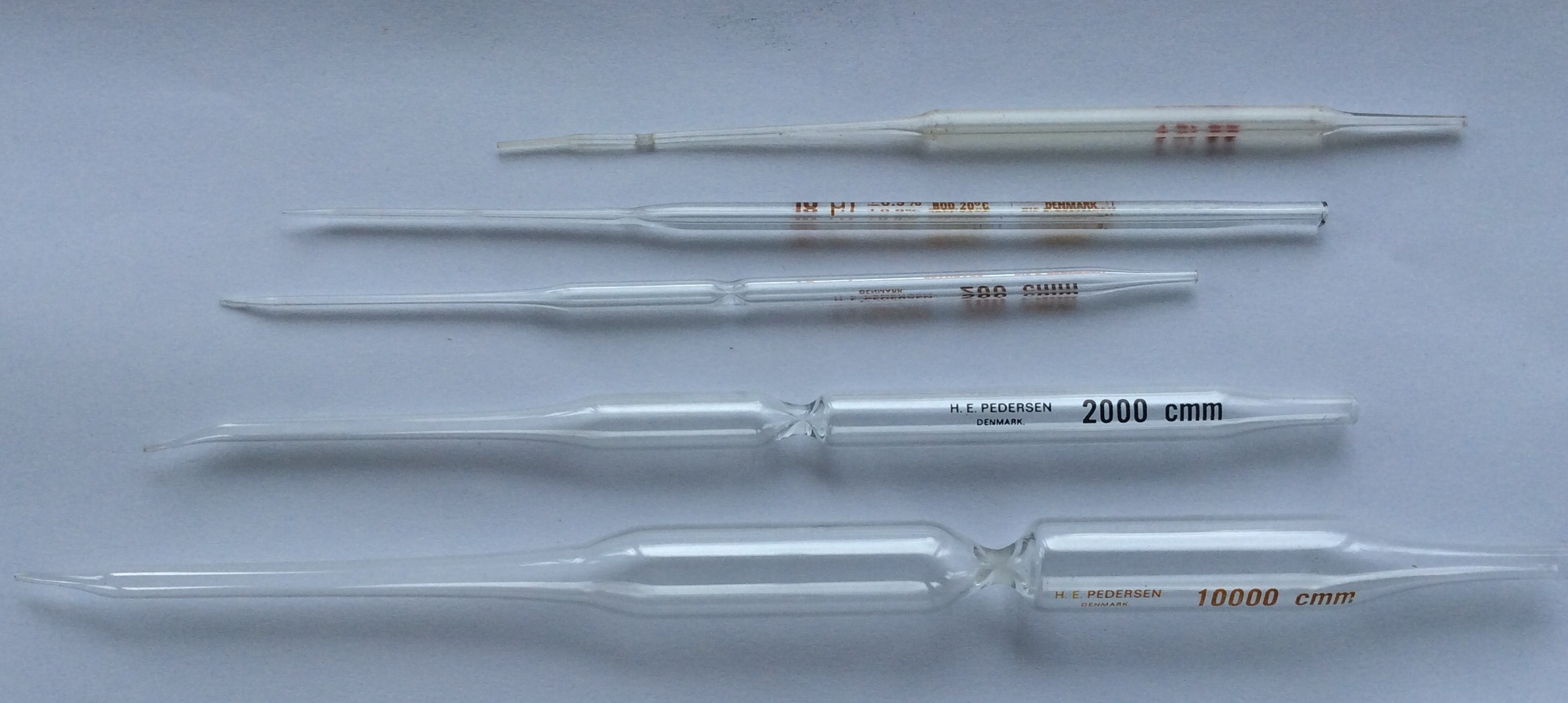
Carlsberg pipettes, glass micropipettes named for their place of invention and first use, The Carlsberg Laboratory, Physiology Department, Copenhagen, Denmark. Used with a mouthpiece for precision biochemical and physiological lab work.
From the top: double constriction pipettes for 1 and 10 microlitres; single constriction pipettes for 200; 2,000; and 10,000 microlitres

Borosilicate glass micropipette pulled with a Flaming/Brown micropipette puller P-97

==== Microfluidic pipette ====
A recent introduction into the micropipette field integrates the versatility of microfluidics into a freely positionable pipette platform. At the tip of the device, a localized flow zone is created which allows for constant control of the nanolitre environment, directly in front of the pipette. The pipettes are made from polydimethylsiloxane (PDMS), which is formed using reactive injection molding. Interfacing of these pipettes using pneumatics enables multiple solutions to be loaded and switched on demand, with solution exchange times of 100ms. This type of pipette was invented by Alar Ainla, and currently situated in the Biophysical Technology Lab. at Chalmers University of Technology in Sweden.

=== Extremely low volume pipettes ===
A zeptolitre pipette has been developed at Brookhaven National Laboratory. The pipette is made of a carbon shell, within which is an alloy of gold-germanium. The pipette was used to learn about how crystallization takes place.

=== Pipette aids ===
A variety of devices have been developed for safer, easier, and more efficient pipetting. For example, a motorized pipette controller can aid liquid aspiration or dispensing using volumetric pipettes or graduated pipettes; a tablet can interact in real-time with the pipette and guide a user through a protocol; and a pipette station can help to control the pipette tip immersion depth and improve ergonomics.

=== Robots ===
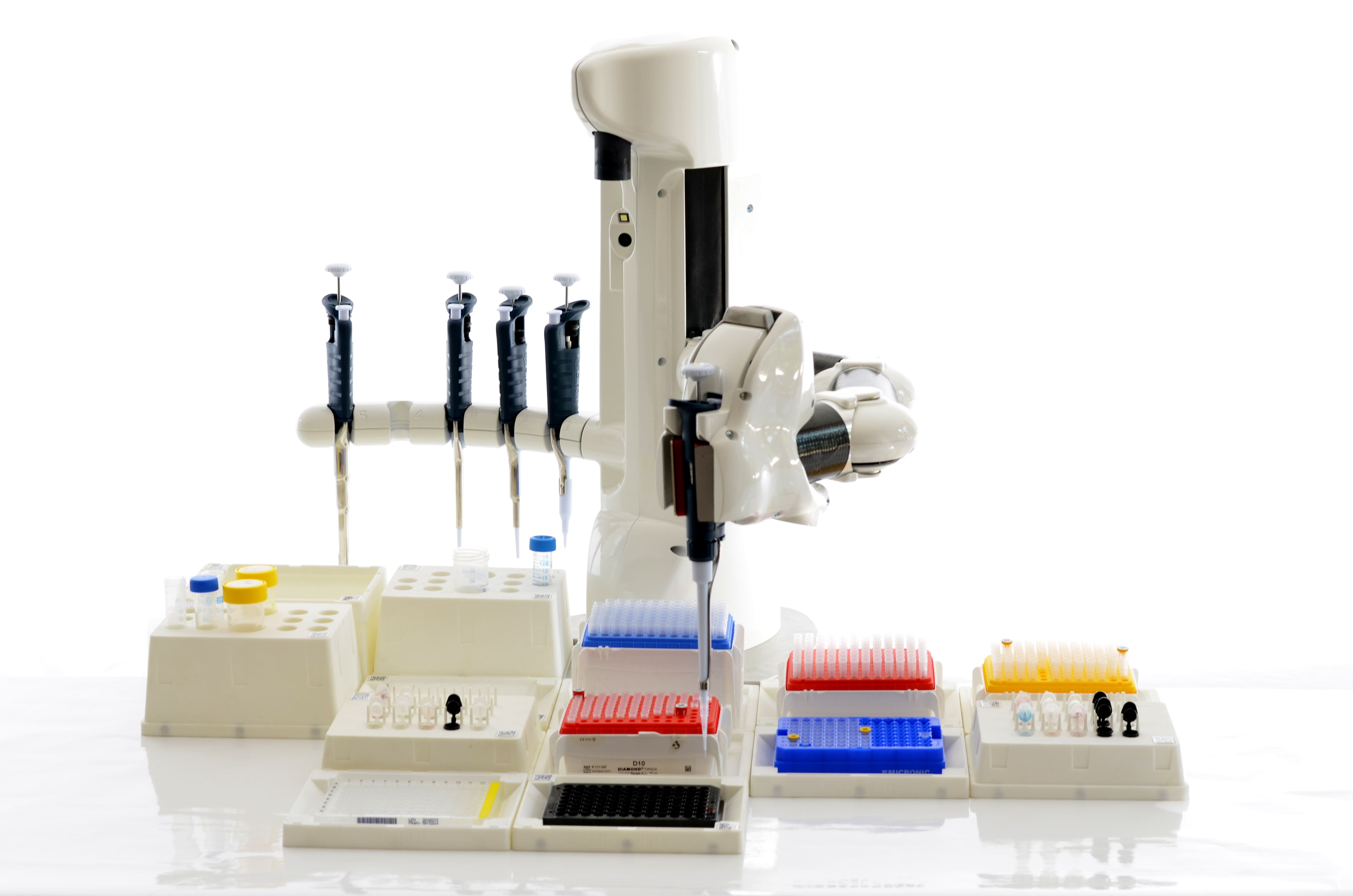
An example of mechanical pipettes manipulated by an anthropomorphic robot

Pipette robots are capable of manipulating pipettes just as humans would do.

== Calibration ==
Pipette recalibration is an important consideration in laboratories using these devices. It is the act of determining the accuracy of a measuring device by comparison with NIST traceable reference standards. Pipette calibration is essential to ensure that the instrument is working according to expectations and as per the defined regimes or work protocols. Pipette calibration is considered to be a complex affair because it includes many elements of calibration procedure and several calibration protocol options as well as makes and models of pipettes to consider.

== Posture and injuries ==
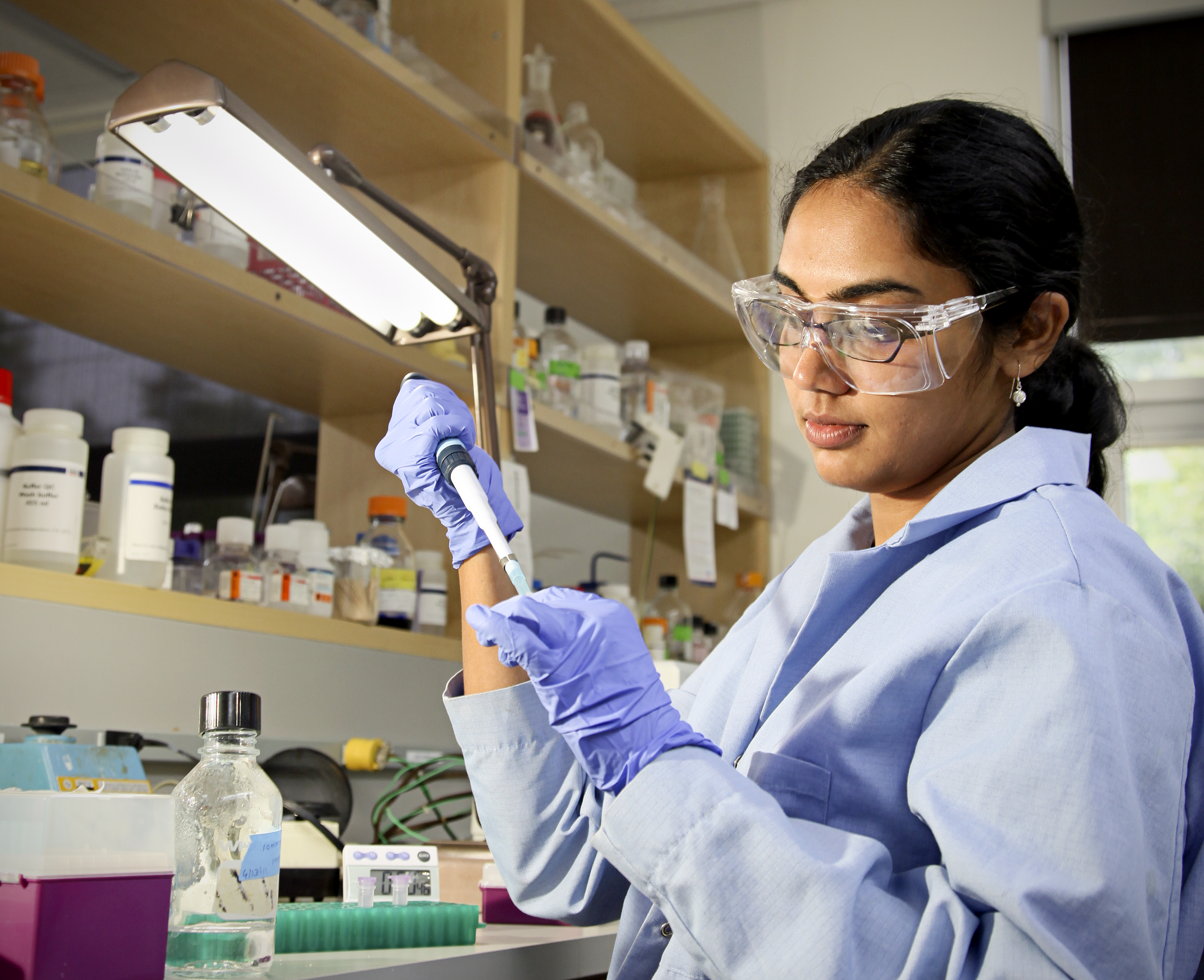
A biochemist pipetting

Proper pipetting posture is the most important element in establishing good ergonomic work practices. During repetitive tasks such as pipetting, maintaining body positions that provide a maximum of strength with the least amount of muscular stress is important to minimize the risk of injury. A number of common pipetting techniques have been identified as potentially hazardous due to biomechanical stress factors. Recommendations for corrective pipetting actions, made by various US governmental agencies and ergonomics experts, are presented below.

Winged elbow pipetting
Technique: elevated, “winged elbow”. The average human arm weighs approximately 6% of the total body weight. Holding a pipette with the elbow extended (winged elbow) in a static position places the weight of the arm onto the neck and shoulder muscles and reduces blood flow, thereby causing stress and fatigue. Muscle strength is also substantially reduced as arm flexion is increased.
Corrective action: Position elbows as close to the body as possible, with arms and wrists extended in straight, neutral positions (handshake posture). Keep work items within easy reach to limit extension and elevation of arm. Arm/hand elevation should not exceed 12” from the worksurface.

Over rotated arm pipetting
Technique: Over-rotated forearm and wrist. Rotation of the forearm in a supinated position (palm up) and/or wrist flexion increases the fluid pressure in the carpal tunnel. This increased pressure can result in compression of soft tissues like nerves, tendons and blood vessels, causing numbness in the thumb and fingers.
Corrective action: Forearm rotation angle near 45° pronation (palm down) should be maintained to minimize carpal tunnel pressure during repetitive activity.

Clenched fist pipetting
Technique: Tight grip (clenched fist). Hand fatigue results from continuous contact between a hard object and sensitive tissues. This occurs when a firm grip is needed to hold a pipette, such as when jamming on a tip, and results in diminished hand strength.
Corrective action: Use pipettes with hooks or other attributes that allow a relaxed grip and/or alleviate need to constantly grip the pipette. This will reduce tension in the arm, wrist and hand.

Thumb plunger pipetting
Technique: Concentrated area of force (contact stress between a hard object and sensitive tissues). Some devices have plungers and buttons with limited surface areas, requiring a great deal of force to be expended by the thumb or other finger in a concentrated area.
Corrective action: Use pipettes with large contoured or rounded plungers and buttons. This will disperse the pressure used to operate the pipette across the entire surface of the thumb or finger, reducing contact pressure to acceptable levels.

Incorrect posture can have a strong impact on available strength arm strength pipetting
Technique: elevated arm. Muscle strength is substantially reduced when arm flexion is increased.
Corrective action: Keep work items within easy reach to limit extension and elevation of arm. Arm/hand elevation should also not exceed 12” from the worksurface.

Elbow strength pipetting
Technique: Elbow flexion or abduction. Arm strength diminishes as elbow posture is deviated from a 90° position.
Corrective action: Keep forearm and hand elevation within 12” of the worksurface, which will allow the elbow to remain near a 90° position.

Unlike traditional axial pipettes, ergonomic pipetting can affect posture and prevent common pipetting injuries such as carpal tunnel syndrome, tendinitis and other musculoskeletal disorders. To be "ergonomically correct" significant changes to traditional pipetting postures are essential, like: minimizing forearm and wrist rotations, keeping a low arm and elbow height and relaxing the shoulders and upper arms.

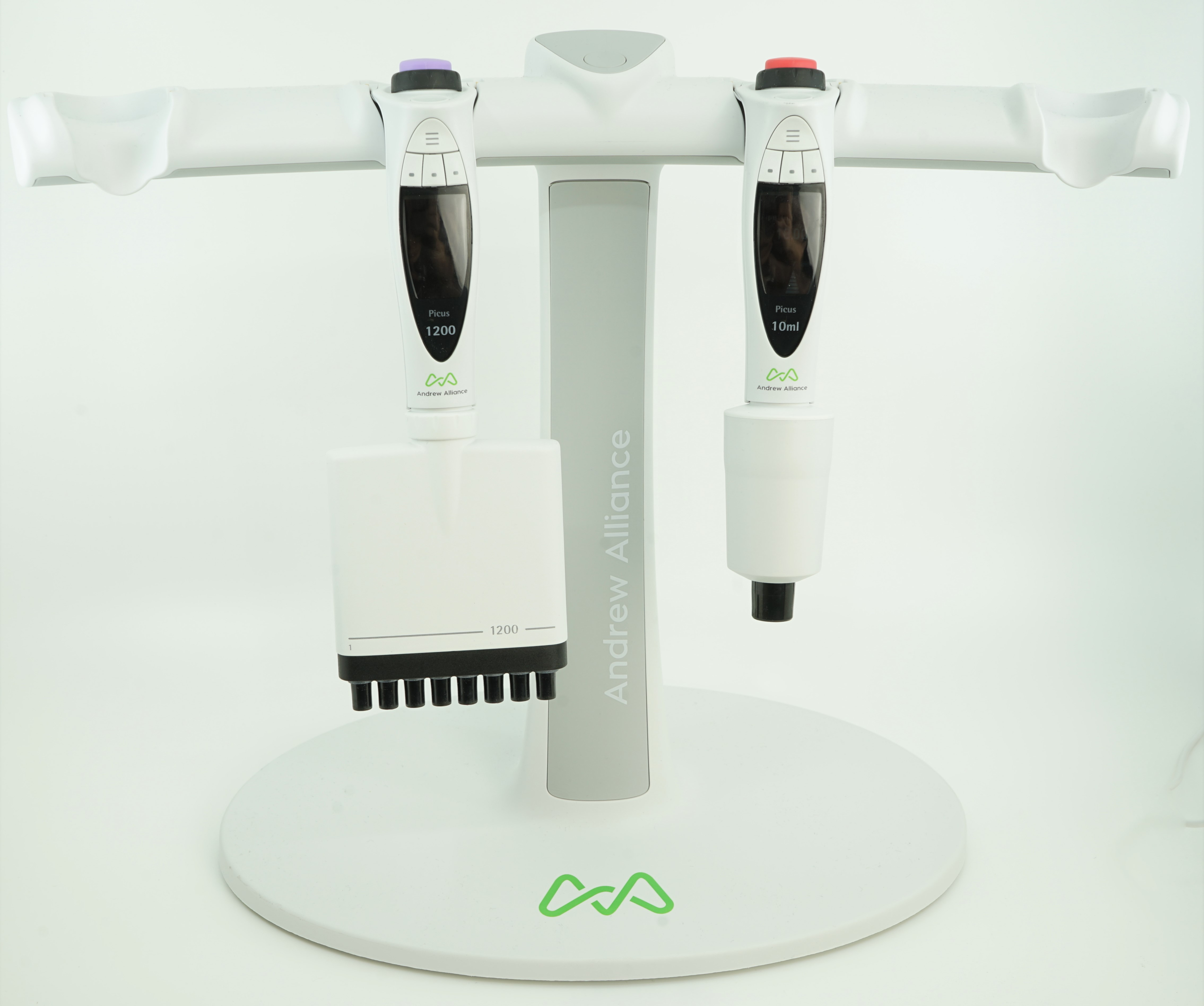
A smart pipette stand that can control electronic pipettes

== Pipette stand ==
Typically the pipettes are vertically stored on holder called pipette stands. In case of electronic pipettes, such stands can recharge their batteries. The most advanced pipette stands can directly control electronic pipettes.

== Alternatives ==
An alternative technology, especially for transferring small volumes (micro and nano litre range) is acoustic droplet ejection.
