= Eppendorf (company) =

German laboratory products company

Eppendorf SE
- Type: Private
- Industry: Life sciences
- Founded: 1945 in Eppendorf, Hamburg, Germany
- Headquarters: Hamburg, Germany
- Area served: Worldwide
- Key people: Christine Munz (CEO); Hans-Christian Stuff (CFO); Philipp von Loeper (Chairman of the Supervisory Board)
- Products: Laboratory devices and consumables
- Revenue: ▲€ 980,3 million (2024)
- Number of employees: 4.658 (2024)
- Website: www.eppendorf.com

Eppendorf (German pronunciation: [ˈɛpn̩dɔʁf]), a company with its registered office in Germany, develops, produces and sells products and services for laboratories around the world.

Eppendorf products are used in academic and industrial research laboratories, e.g. in companies in the pharmaceutical, biotech, chemical and food industries. They are also used in laboratories that perform clinical or environmental analysis, in forensic laboratories, and in industrial laboratories where industrial process analysis, production and quality assurance are performed. Eppendorf describes its business as consisting of three divisions: liquid handling, cell handling, and sample handling.

== Products ==
Eppendorf develops, produces and sells devices, consumables and services for laboratories. The liquid handling line includes products such as manual and electronic micropipettes, automated pipetting systems, and milliliter pipette controllers. The cell handling line includes products such as fermenters and bioreactors and cell culture supplies. The sample handling line includes products such as centrifuges and related accessories, PCR equipment, laboratory freezers, and reagent tubes.

== History ==
Eppendorf was founded in 1945 by Heinrich Netheler and Hans Hinz in the Hamburg district of Eppendorf on the grounds of the University Hospital Eppendorf, originally as a workshop for medical devices. Dr Netheler and Dr Hinz developed the first ultrasound device and the stimulator, a machine used for diagnosing and therapeutically treating muscle and nerve damage. They also invented an electrical thermometer (the “Thermorapid”) that, for the first time, enabled body temperature to be measured in just a few seconds.

In 1954, the company was renamed "Netheler & Hinz GmbH". In 2000, Eppendorf Gerätebau, Netheler und Hinz GmbH was renamed Eppendorf AG and became a public company.

In 1961, Eppendorf launched the microliter pipette system. This allowed precise measurement of liquids. The first microcentrifuge was sold in 1962.

In 1965, the company moved to a facility at the Barkhausenweg in the Hamburg district of Hummelsbüttel, where Eppendorf has been headquartered ever since.

In 2015, Eppendorf entered into a partnership with Bio-ITech, a life sciences company that provides software for managing information in laboratory workflows around the world. Eppendorf provided funding to Bio-ITech to drive growth as well as professionalize the company.

In March 2017, Eppendorf becomes shareholder of Bio-ITech B.V (Bio-ITech is branded as eLabNext, now SciSure).

Since August 2024, Dr. Christine Munz (CEO) and Hans-Christian Stuff (CFO) have been steering the Eppendorf Group. They succeeded the leadership duo of Eva van Pelt and Peter Fruhstorfer. The two co-CEOs took over the responsibilities from Thomas Bachmann, who had assumed the chairmanship in 2015 from Dirk Ehlers. In 2011, Ehlers had replaced Klaus Fink, who had been Chairman of the Executive Board for many years, who then took over as Chairman of the Supervisory Board until 2016. Philipp von Loeper has been Chairman of the Supervisory Board of Eppendorf AG since 2016.

In September 2022, Eppendorf made a deal with eLabNext and Clustermarket, which enabled Eppendorf to transmit laboratory instrument data in the proper context and further the all-encompassing philosophy of its own digital platform, VisioNize Lab Suite.

Eppendorf sponsors awards for investigators which are awarded through Science Magazine.

== Acquisitions ==
In 2007, Eppendorf took over New Brunswick Scientific Co., an American company headquartered in Edison, New Jersey.

In January 2012, Eppendorf acquired DASGIP, a mid-sized German company headquartered in Jülich, Germany that manufactured parallel bioreactor systems.

Eppendorf acquired Calibration Technology Ltd, headquartered in Limerick, Ireland, in November 2016 in order to expand its service presence into Ireland.

In January 2022 Eppendorf acquired the Japanese company Koki Holdings Co., Ltd, whose products are marketed globally under the brand name Himac in 2020.
