= Brattain =

Brattain is a surname. Notable people with the surname include:

- Hazen A. Brattain (1864–1930), American rancher, banker and politician
- Robert Brattain (1911–2002), American physicist
- Walter Houser Brattain (1902–1987), American physicist
