= George Downs =

George Downs may refer to:

- George Downs (umpire) (1856–1936), Australian Test cricket umpire
- George W. Downs (physicist), co-founder of Applied Physics Corporation (a.k.a. Cary Instruments)
- George W. Downs (political scientist) (1946–2015), American political scientist
