= Howard Cary =

American engineer

Henry Howard Cary
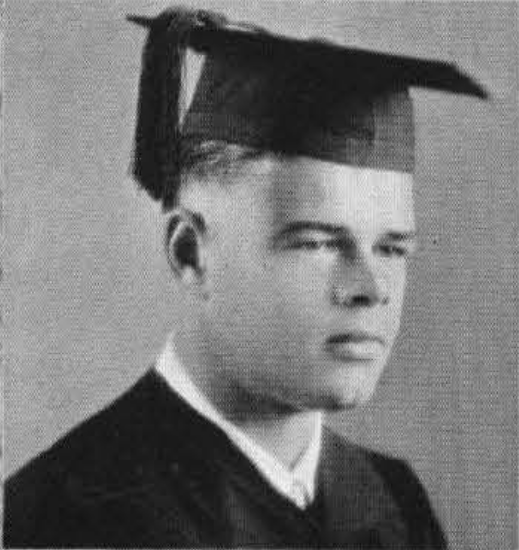
- Graduation photo, 1930
- Born: May 3, 1908; Los Angeles, California
- Died: December 20, 1991 (aged 83); Orange, California
- Education: California Institute of Technology
- Awards: David Richardson Medal
- Scientific career
- Fields: Physical Chemistry
- Workplaces: Beckman Instruments, Cary Instruments

Henry Cary (3 May 1908 – 20 December 1991) was an American engineer and the co-founder of the Applied Physics Corporation (later known as Cary Instruments), along with George W. Downs and William Miller. The Cary 14 UV-Vis-NIR and the Cary Model 81 Raman Spectrophotometer were particularly important contributions in scientific instrumentation and spectroscopy. Before starting Applied Physics, Cary was employed by Beckman Instruments, where he worked on the design of several instruments including the ubiquitous DU spectrophotometer. Howard Cary was a founder and the first president of the Optical Society of Southern California.

== Personal life ==
Henry Howard Cary was born on 3 May 1908 in Los Angeles, California to Henry Gardner Cary and Bessie (Brown) Cary.

The 1940 US Census listed Cary as married to Barbara (Ward) Cary from Washington state. His occupation was recorded as research engineer and industry as laboratory.

In 1991, Cary died of pneumonia after a long illness at Orange, California.

== Education ==
In 1925, after graduating from Los Angeles High School, Cary entered the California Institute of Technology. He missed one year due to illness, and graduated in 1930 with a B.S. degree in civil engineering. In sports, he was captain of the varsity tennis squad. During his first year he won the junior travel prize. Cary was a member of Sigma Xi.

After receiving his degree, Cary went to work in his father's plumbing construction business, H. G. Cary Co. He held a variety of engineering and accounting positions with the company during the early years of the Great Depression.

== National Technical Laboratories ==
As of May 31, 1935, Cary was hired by Arnold Beckman of National Technical Laboratories (NTL) (later Beckman Instruments). By 1937, Cary was the chief design engineer on Beckman's research team. Cary distinguished himself in work relating to pH meters and glass electrodes, and became vice-president of development. By 1940 Cary and Beckman were developing a quartz spectrophotometer. They presented a paper on this work in July 1941 at MIT's Summer Conference on Spectroscopy. Cary made substantial contributions, including the design of a reliable ultraviolet phototube for the instrument. The DU spectrophotometer was the first easy-to-use single instrument containing both the optical and electronic components needed for ultraviolet-absorption spectrophotometry.

During World War II, National Technical Laboratories worked on a number of then-secret projects, including one for the development of synthetic rubber. The Office of Rubber Reserve of the United States government contracted with NTL to produce an infrared spectrophotometer based on a single-beam design by Robert Brattain of Shell Development Company. The first Beckman IR-1 Spectrophotometer was shipped to Shell on September 18, 1942 barely six months after it was ordered. The IR-1 used a Littrow prism mounting featuring a single rock salt prism with a mirrored back, and an analog galvanometer for presenting results.

Cary and Beckman adapted features from the pH meter and the DU spectrophotometer to improve the design of the IR-1 spectrophotometer. By 1945, the IR-2 spectrophotometer was in production, using an electronic vacuum tube amplifier instead of a galvanometer, and a thermocouple tube for the detection of infrared light.

== Cary Instruments ==
In January 1946, Cary left NTL to form his own company, Applied Physics Corporation (later known as Cary Instruments) in Pasadena, California, with George W. Downs, William Miller, and Russell E. Vaniman. Cary and his company developed a range of scientific instruments, particularly dual-beam spectrophotometers. The Applied Physics Corporation made its first delivery, a Cary 11 UV-Vis spectrophotometer, to Mellon Institute in Pittsburgh, Pennsylvania, in April 1947. The Cary 11 was followed by the Cary 14 UV-Vis-NIR in 1954, the Cary 15 UV-Vis in 1961, the Cary 16 UV-Vis in 1964, and an expanded offering of instruments through the 70s, 80s, and 90s.

The Cary 14 spectrophotometer used a double folded-z-configuration monochromator. Appearing on the market in 1954, it was the first commercial UV-VIS-NIR instrument to fully extend into the near-infrared spectrum.

The Cary Model 81 Raman Spectrophotometer was an important contribution to high-performance Raman spectroscopy. Described as "famous" it gave the field of Raman spectrophotometry a "tremendous boost" in the United States.

Other instruments included nondispersive infrared gas analyzers electrometers such as the Cary Model 31 and 36 Electrometers which used a vibrating reed with an ionization chamber and calorimeters such as the Cary Model 41 Calorimeter.

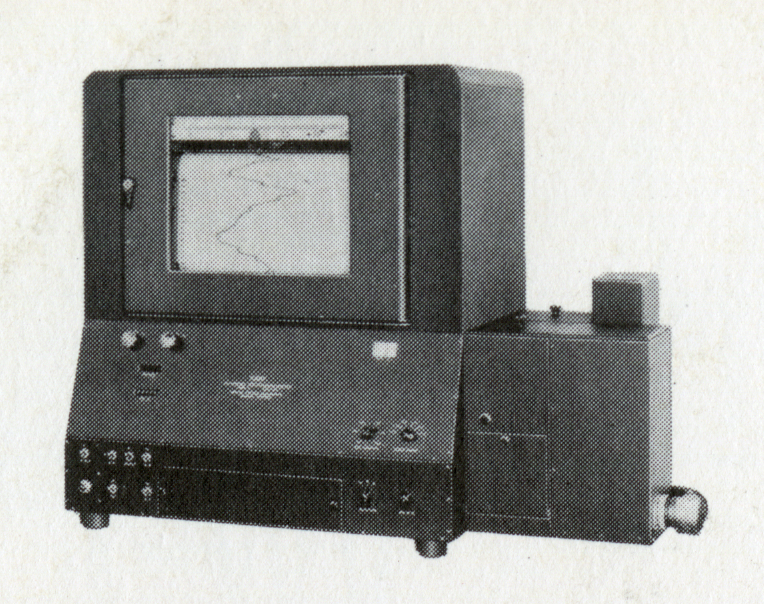
Cary Model 11 Recording Spectrophotometer

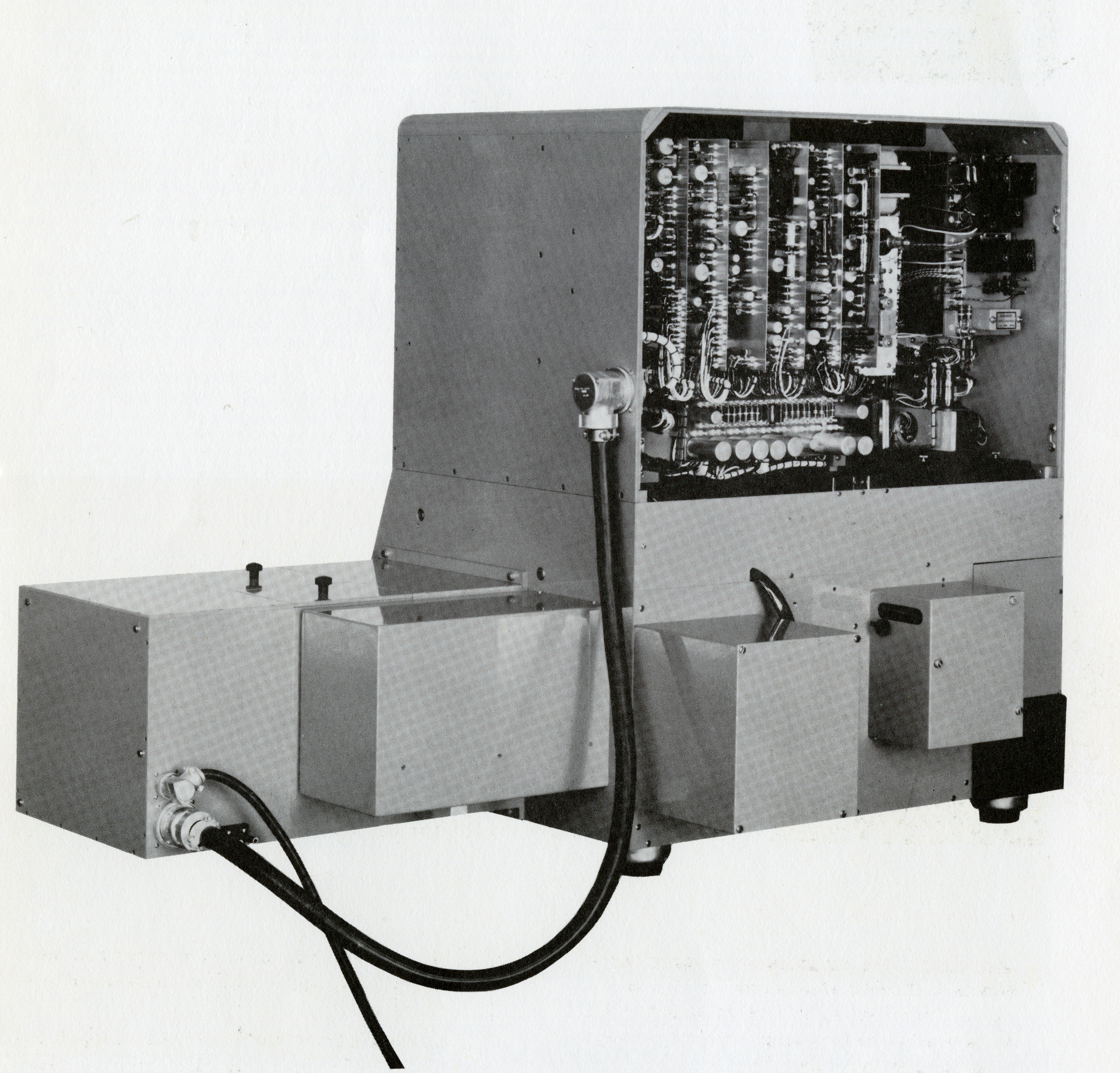
Cary Model 14 Recording Spectrophotometer (back open)

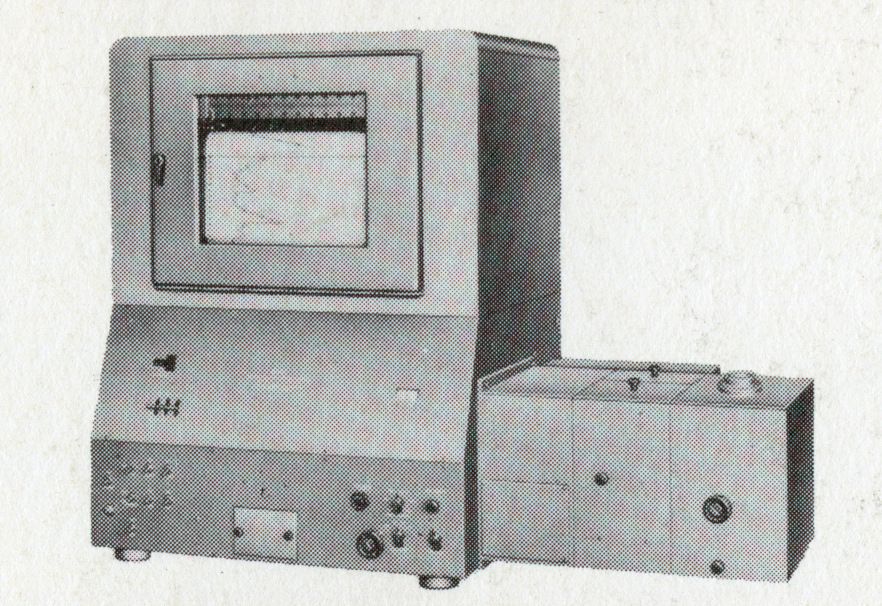
Model 14B Recording Spectrophotometer (front)

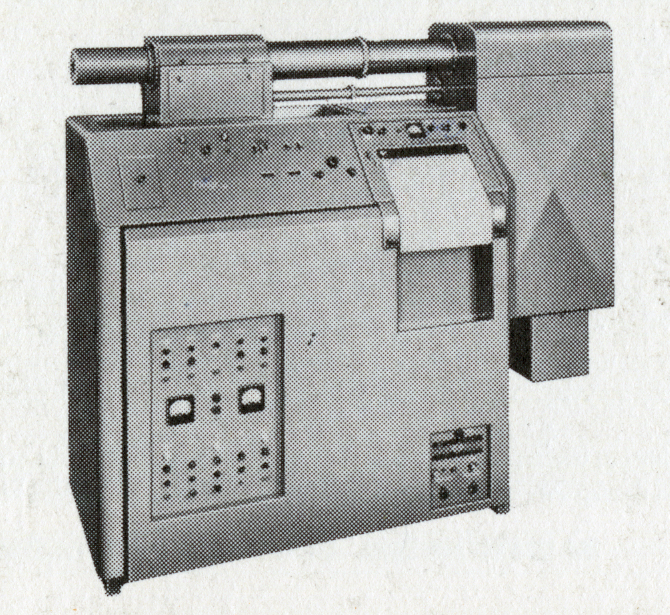
Cary Model 81 Raman Spectrophotometer

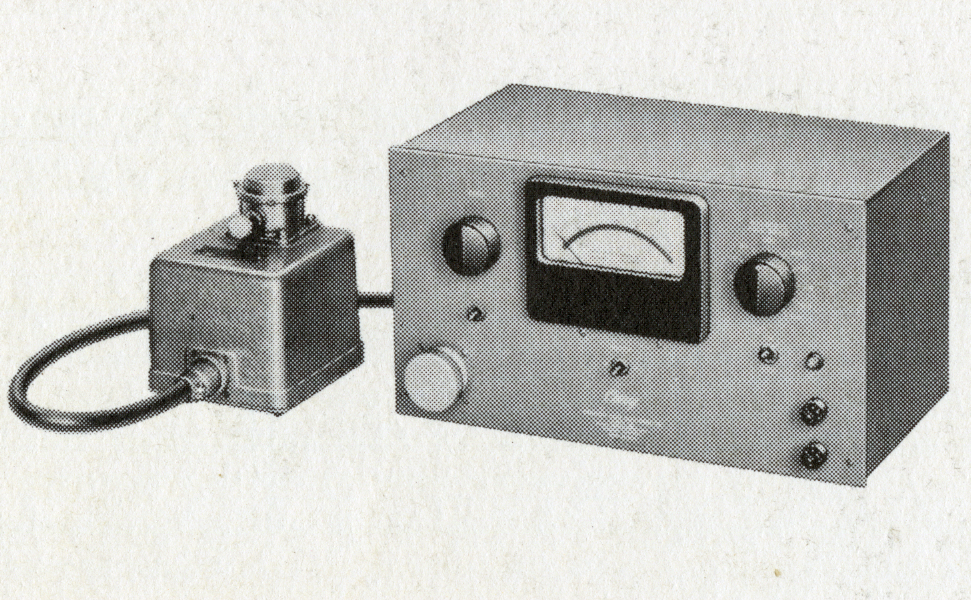
Cary Model 31 Electrometer

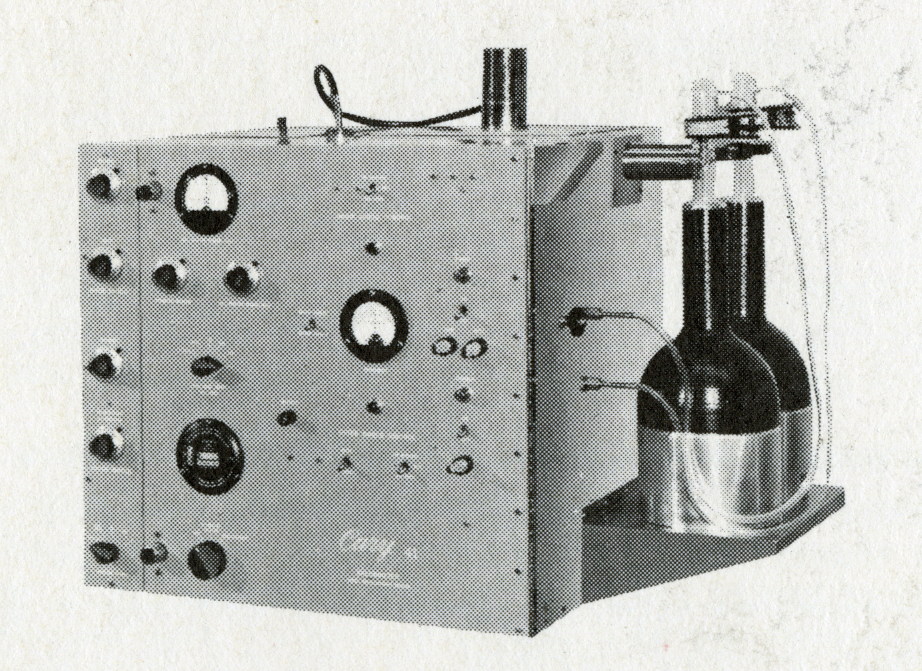
Cary Model 41 Calorimeter

In 1966 the Applied Physics Corporation was one of a number of companies acquired by Varian Associates during a period of rapid expansion by Varian. Applied Physics Corporation was renamed Cary Instruments as a subsidiary of Varian. Also in 1966, groundbreaking for a new building for the company occurred in Monrovia, California. In 1972 the company moved to Varian's facilities in Palo Alto, California. In 1982, it moved again, to Varian's Techtron facilities in Melbourne, Australia.

== Awards and honors ==
In 1959, Cary was the recipient of the American Chemical Society Division of Analytical Chemistry's Award in Chemical Instrumentation. Robert Brattain described Cary's approach to instrument design, when giving the award.

First, he does not necessarily start from where others have left off. Rather, he goes back to the basic problem and gets it clearly enough in his mind that he can start his thinking and his theoretical development from a simple, logical statement of the problem. Second, he uses his very marked ability as a theoretician; an ability well known to his close associates but probably not as well known in general as it deserves to be, to develop a logical analysis based on the simple statement of the problem and exploring various methods of solution. Thirdly, Howard believes what a logical analysis of the problem tells him. Consequently, throughout the entire period of theoretical design, he avoids being trapped into blind acceptance of the folklore in a particular area and consequently, his designs consistently include new and original approaches.

In 1969, Cary was awarded the David Richardson Medal by the Optical Society of America. Cary was honored for: "his painstakingly careful and very valuable contributions to the design and production of highly precise instrumentation in areas which range from spectroscopy to chemical, medical and nuclear research."

In 1977, Howard Cary received the Maurice F. Hasler Award at Pittcon "for his pioneering leadership in the development of instrumentation for absorption and Raman spectroscopy".

== Patents ==
Cary is listed on a considerable number of patents for his work at National Technical Laboratories and Cary Instruments, often as "Henry H. Cary" or "H. H. Cary". They include:

- "Automatic voltage and pH indicator", February 18, 1941, for the Beckman pH meter
- "Apparatus for amplifying direct current voltages and currents", February 18, 1941, for the Beckman pH meter
- "Method and apparatus for winding resistance elements", December 9, 1952, for the Beckman Helipot potentiometer
- "Infrared spectrophotometer", July 31, 1951, for the Beckman IR-2 spectrophotometer
- "Double folded-z-configuration monochromator". This monochromator is the heart of the Cary Model 14 UV-VIS Spectrophotometer. The monochromator patent drawings also show the dual beam configuration with the optical chopper, etc. as an example.
- "Raman spectrophotometer", June 14, 1960.

== Publications ==
- Cary, H. H.; Beckman, Arnold O. (1 November 1941). "A Quartz Photoelectric Spectrophotometer*". Journal of the Optical Society of America. 31 (11): 682. Bibcode:1941JOSA...31..682C. doi:10.1364/JOSA.31.000682.
- Cary, H. H. (1941). Operating Instructions for Beckman Spectrophotometer. Pasadena, California: National Technical Laboratories.
- Cary, H. H. (1946). "New Instruments". Review of Scientific Instruments. 17 (12): 558. Bibcode:1946RScI...17..558W. doi:10.1063/1.1770432.
- Cary, H. H. (1949). "The Effect of Optical Design and the Limit of Energy Detectable". OSU International Symposium on Molecular Spectroscopy. hdl:1811/21726.
- Cary, H.; Hawes, R.; George, K.; Mann, A.; Rock, F. (1959). "Aids in Raman Spectroscopy". Spectrochimica Acta. 15 (3–4): 299.
- Cary, Howard; Hawes, R. C.; Hooper, Paige B.; Duffield, J. J.; George, K. P. (1964). "A Recording Spectropolarimeter". Applied Optics. 3 (3): 329–337. Bibcode:1964ApOpt...3..329C. doi:10.1364/ao.3.000329.

== Professional service ==
- Optical Society of California, co-founder and first president, formed in 1951
- Instrumentation Society of America, president
- Western Spectroscopy Association, executive committee
- American Physical Society, member
- American Chemical Society, member
- Institute of Radio Engineers, member
- Society for Applied Spectroscopy, member
