= DU spectrophotometer =

First commercially viable UV-visible light absorbance instrument

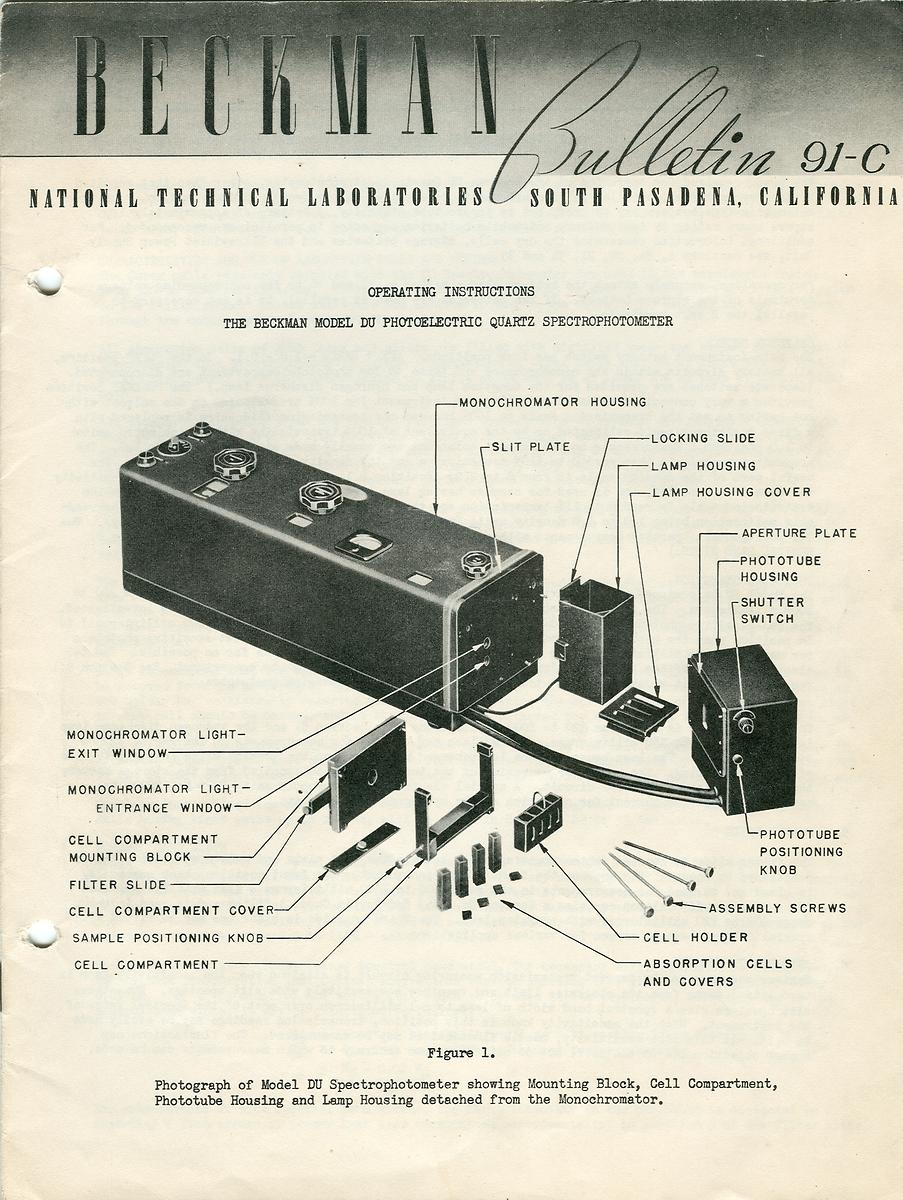
DU Spectrophotometer, National Technical Laboratories, 1947

The DU spectrophotometer or Beckman DU, introduced in 1941, was the first commercially viable scientific instrument for measuring the amount of ultraviolet light absorbed by a substance. This model of spectrophotometer enabled scientists to easily examine and identify a given substance based on its absorption spectrum, the pattern of light absorbed at different wavelengths. Arnold Orville. Beckman's National Technical Laboratories (later Beckman Instruments) developed three in-house prototype models (A, B, C) and one limited distribution model (D) before moving to full commercial production with the DU. Approximately 30,000 DU spectrophotometers were manufactured and sold between 1941 and 1976.

Sometimes referred to as a UV–Vis spectrophotometer because it measured both the ultraviolet (UV) and visible spectra, the DU spectrophotometer is credited as being a truly revolutionary technology. It yielded more accurate results than previous methods for determining the chemical composition of a complex substance, and substantially reduced the time needed for an accurate analysis from weeks or hours to minutes. The Beckman DU was essential to several critical secret research projects during World War II, including the development of penicillin and synthetic rubber.

== Background ==
Before the development of the DU spectrophotometer, analysis of a test sample to determine its components was a long, costly, and often inaccurate process. A classical wet laboratory contained a wide variety of complicated apparatus. Test samples were run through a series of awkward and time-consuming qualitative processes to separate out and identify their components. Determining quantitative concentrations of those components in the sample involved further steps. Processes could involve techniques for chemical reactions, precipitations, filtrations and dissolutions. Determination of the concentrations of known impurities in a known inorganic substance such as molten iron could be done in under thirty minutes. The determination of complex organic structures such as chlorophyll using wet and dry methods could take decades.

Spectroscopic methods for observing the absorption of electromagnetic radiation in the visible spectrum were known as early as the 1860s. Scientists had observed that light traveling through a medium would be absorbed at different wavelengths, depending on the matter-composition of the medium involved. A white light source would emit light at multiple wavelengths over a range of frequencies. A prism could be used to separate a light source into specific wavelengths. Shining the light through a sample of a material would cause some wavelengths of light to be absorbed, while others would be unaffected and continue to be transmitted. Wavelengths in the resulting absorption spectrum would differ depending upon the atomic and molecular composition if the material involved.

Spectroscopic methods were predominantly used by physicists and astrophysicists. Spectroscopic techniques were rarely taught in chemistry classes and were unfamiliar to most practicing chemists. Beginning around 1904, Frank Twyman of the London instrument making firm Adam Hilger, Ltd. tried to develop spectroscopic instruments for chemists, but his customer base was consistently made up of physicists rather than chemists. By the 1930s he had developed a niche market in metallurgy, where his instruments were well adapted to the types of problems that chemists were solving.

By the 1940s, both academic and industrial chemists were becoming increasingly interested in problems involving the composition and detection of biological molecules. Biological molecules, including proteins and nucleic acids, absorb light energy in both the ultraviolet and visible range. The spectrum of visible light was not broad enough to enable scientists to examine substances such as vitamin A. Accurate characterization of complex samples, particularly of biological materials, would require the accurate reading of absorption frequencies in the ultraviolet and infrared (IR) sections of the spectrum in addition to visible light. Existing instruments such as the Cenco "Spectrophotelometer" and the Coleman Model DM Spectrophotometer could not be effectively used to examine wavelengths in the ultraviolet range.

The array of equipment needed to measure light energy reaching beyond the visible spectrum towards the ultraviolet could cost a laboratory as much as $3,000, a huge amount in 1940. Repeated readings of a sample were taken to produce photographic plates showing the absorption spectrum of a material at different wavelengths. An experienced human could compare these to the known images to identify a match. Then information from the plates had to be combined to create a graph showing the spectrum as a whole. Ultimately, the accuracy of such approaches was dependent on accurate, consistent development of the photographic plates, and on human visual acuity and practice in reading the wavelengths.

== Development ==
The DU was developed at National Technical Laboratories (later Beckman Instruments) under the direction of Arnold Orville Beckman, an American chemist and inventor. Beginning in 1940, National Technical Laboratories developed three in-house prototype models (A, B, C) and one limited distribution model (D) before moving to full commercial production with the DU in 1941. Beckman's research team was led by Howard Cary, who went on to co-found Applied Physics Corporation (later Cary Instruments) which became one of Beckman Instruments' strongest competitors. Other scientists included Roland Hawes and Kenyon George.

Coleman Instruments had recently coupled a pH meter with an optical phototube unit to examine the visual spectrum (the Coleman Model DM). Beckman had already developed a successful pH meter for measuring acidity of solutions, his company's breakthrough product. Seeing the potential to build upon their existing expertise, Beckman made it a goal to create an easy-to-use integrated instrument which would both register and report specific wavelengths extending into the ultraviolet range. Rather than depending on development of photographic plates, or a human observer's visual ability to detect wavelengths in the absorption spectrum, phototubes would be used to register and report the specific wavelengths that were detected. This had the potential to increase the instrument's accuracy and reliability as well as its speed and ease of use.

=== Model A (prototype) ===
The first prototype Beckman spectrophotometer, the Model A, was created at National Technologies Laboratories in 1940. It used a tungsten light source with a glass Fery prism as a monochromator. Tungsten was used for incandescent light filaments because it was strong, withstood heat, and emitted a steady light. Types of light sources differed in the range of wavelengths of light that they emitted. Tungsten lamps were useful in the visible light range but gave poor coverage in the ultraviolet range. However, they had the advantage of being readily available because they were used as automobile headlamps. An external amplifier from the Beckman pH meter and a vacuum tube photocell were used to detect wavelengths.

=== Model B (prototype) ===
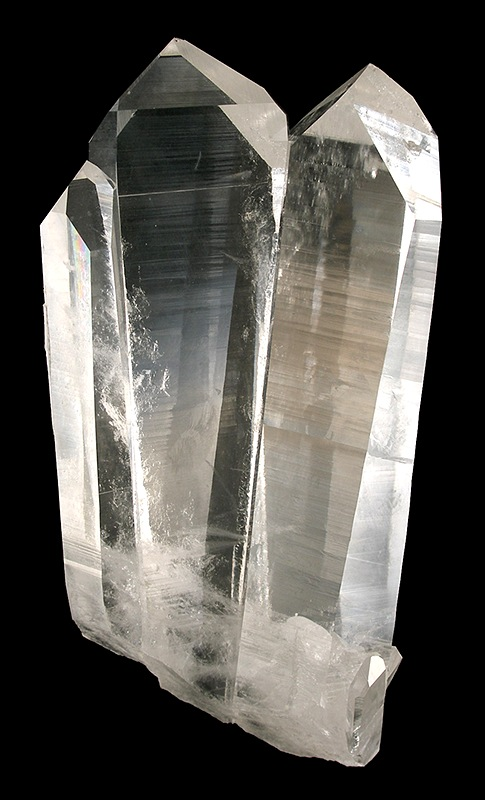
Optical quality quartz crystals

It was quickly realized that a glass dispersive prism was not suitable for use in the ultraviolet spectrum. Glass absorbed electromagnetic radiation below 400 millimicrons rather than dispersing it. In the Model B, a quartz prism was substituted for the earlier glass.

A tangent bar mechanism was used to adjust the monochromator. The mechanism was highly sensitive and required a skilled operator. Only two Model B prototypes were made. One was sold: in February 1941, to the University of California Chemistry department in Los Angeles.

The Model B prototype should be distinguished from a later production model of spectrophotometer that was also referred to as the Model "B". The production Model "B" was introduced in 1949 as a less-expensive, simple-to-use alternative to the Beckman DU. It used a glass Fery prism as a chromator and operated in a narrower range, roughly from 320 millimicrons to 950 millimicrons, and 5 to 20 Å.

=== Model C (prototype) ===
Three Model C instruments were then built, improving the instrument's wavelength resolution. The Model B's rotary cell compartment was replaced with a linear sample chamber. The tangent bar mechanism was replaced by a scroll drive mechanism, which could be more precisely controlled to reset the quartz prism and select the desired wavelength. With this new mechanism, results could be more easily and reliably obtained, without requiring a highly skilled operator. This set the pattern for all of Beckman's later quartz prism instruments. Although only three Model B prototypes were built, all were sold, one to Caltech and the other two to companies in the food industry.

=== Model D (limited production) ===
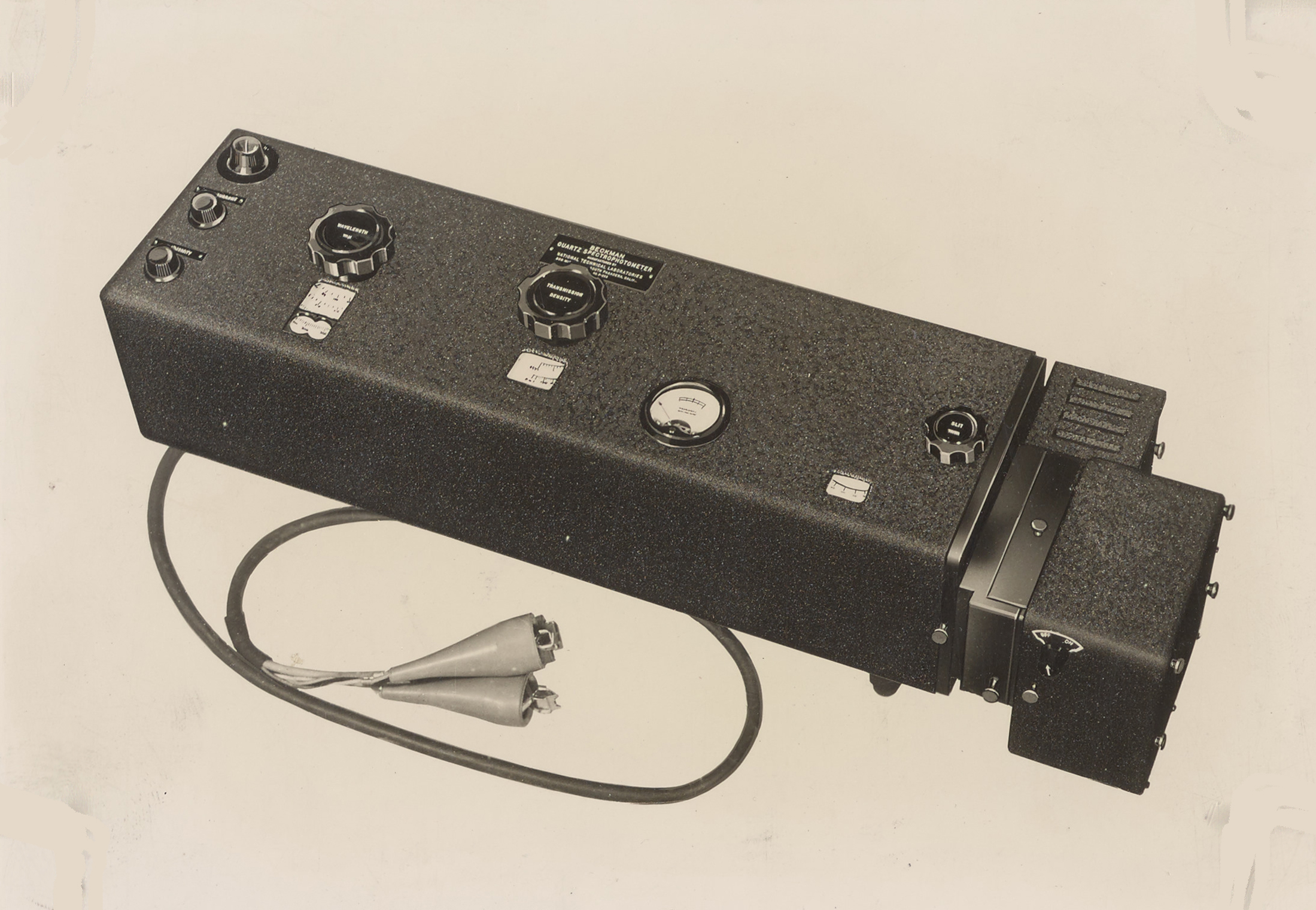
Quartz photoelectric spectrophotometer, Cary & Beckman, 1941

The A, B, and C prototype models all coupled an external Beckman pH meter to the optical component to obtain readouts. In developing the Model D, Beckman took the direct-coupled amplifier circuit from the pH meter and combined the optical and electronic components in a single housing, making it more economical.

Moving from a prototype to production of the Model D involved challenges. Beckman originally approached Bausch and Lomb about making quartz prisms for the spectrophotometer. When they turned down the opportunity, National Technical Laboratories designed its own optical system, including both a control mechanism and a quartz prism. Large, high optical quality quartz suitable for creating prisms was difficult to obtain. It came from Brazil, and was in demand for wartime radio oscillators. Beckman had to obtain a wartime priority listing for the spectrophotometer to get access to suitable quartz supplies.

Beckman had previously attempted to find a source of reliable hydrogen lamps, seeking better sensitivity to wavelengths in the ultraviolet range than was possible with tungsten. As described in July 1941, the Beckman spectrophotometer could use a "hot cathode hydrogen discharge tube" or a tungsten light source interchangeably. However, Beckman was still unsatisfied with the available hydrogen lamps. National Technical Laboratories designed its own hydrogen lamp, an anode enclosed in a thin blown-glass window. By December 1941, the in-house design was being used in production of the Model D.

The instrument's design also required a more sensitive phototube than was commercially available at that time. Beckman was able to obtain small batches of an experimental phototube from RCA for the first Model D instruments.

The Model D spectrophotometer, using the experimental RCA phototube, was shown at MIT's Summer Conference on Spectroscopy in July 1941. The paper that Cary and Beckman presented there was published in the Journal of the Optical Society of America. In it, Cary and Beckman compared designs for a modified self-collimating quartz Fery prism, a mirror-collimated quartz Littrow prism, and various gratings. The Littrow prism was a half-prism, which had a mirrored back face, so that the light went through the front face twice. Use of a tungsten light source with the quartz Littrow prism as a monochromator was reported to minimize light scattering within the instrument.

The Model D was the first model to enter actual production. A small number of Model D instruments were sold, beginning in July 1941, before it was superseded by the DU.

=== Model DU ===
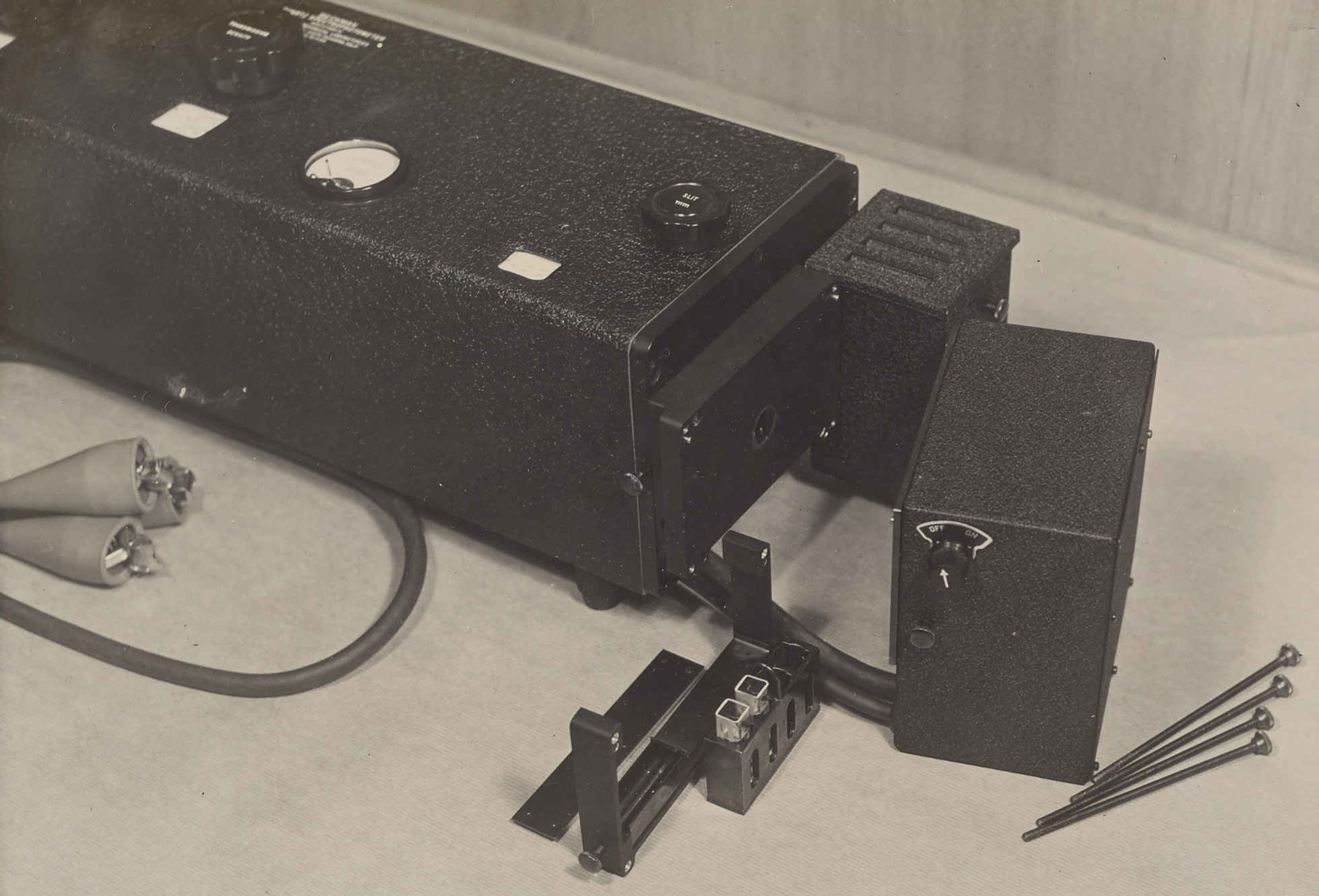
Disassembled absorption cell and photo-tube compartment, Cary & Beckman, 1941

When RCA could not meet Beckman's demand for experimental phototubes, National Technical Laboratories again had to design its own components in-house. They developed a pair of phototubes, sensitive to the red and blue areas of the spectrum, capable of amplifying the signals they received. With the incorporation of Beckman's UV-sensitive phototubes, the Model D became the Model DU UV–Vis spectrophotometer. Its designation as a "UV–Vis" spectrophotometer indicates its ability to measure light in both the visible and ultraviolet spectra.

The DU was the first commercially viable scientific instrument for measuring the amount of ultraviolet light absorbed by a substance. As he had done with the pH meter, Beckman had replaced an array of complicated equipment with a single, easy-to-use instrument. One of the first fully integrated instruments or "black boxes" used in modern chemical laboratories, it sold for $723 in 1941.

It is generally assumed that the "DU" in the name was a combination of "D" for the Model D on which it was based, and "U" for the ultraviolet spectrum. However, it has been suggested that "DU" may also reference Beckman's fraternity at the University of Illinois, Delta Upsilon, whose members were called "DU"s.

A publication in the scholarly literature compared the optical quality of the DU to the Cary 14 Spectrophotometer, another leading UV–Vis spectrophotometer of the time.

== Design ==
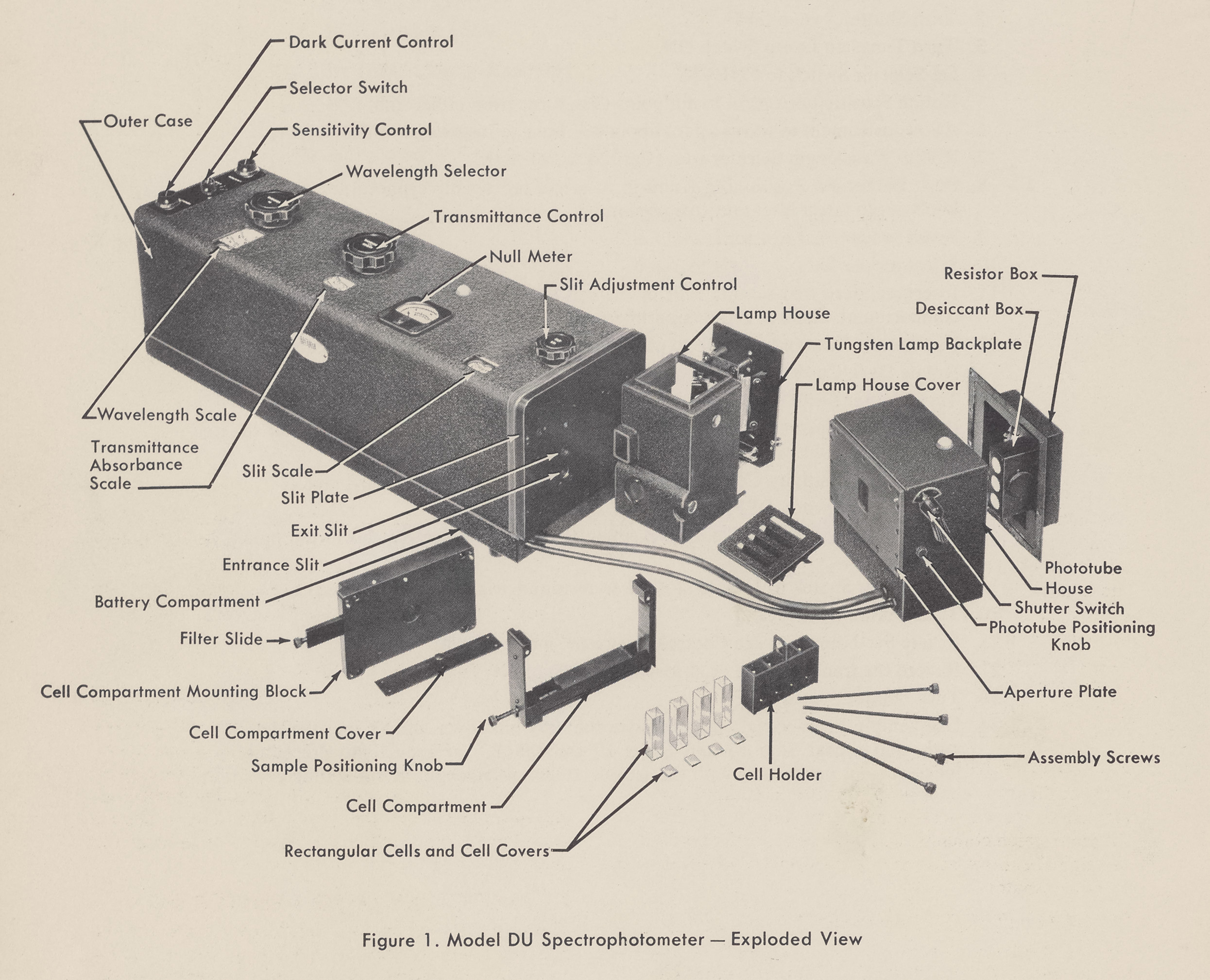
Model DU spectrophotometer – exploded view, Beckman manual, 1954

From 1941 until 1976, when it was discontinued, the Model DU spectrophotometer was built upon what was essentially the same design. It was a single beam instrument. The DU spectrophotometers used a quartz prism to separate light from a lamp into its absorption spectrum and a phototube to electrically measure the light energy across the spectrum. This allowed the user to plot the light absorption spectrum of a substance to obtain a standardized "fingerprint" characteristic of a compound. All modern UV–Vis spectrophotometer are built on the same basic principles as the DU spectrophotometer.

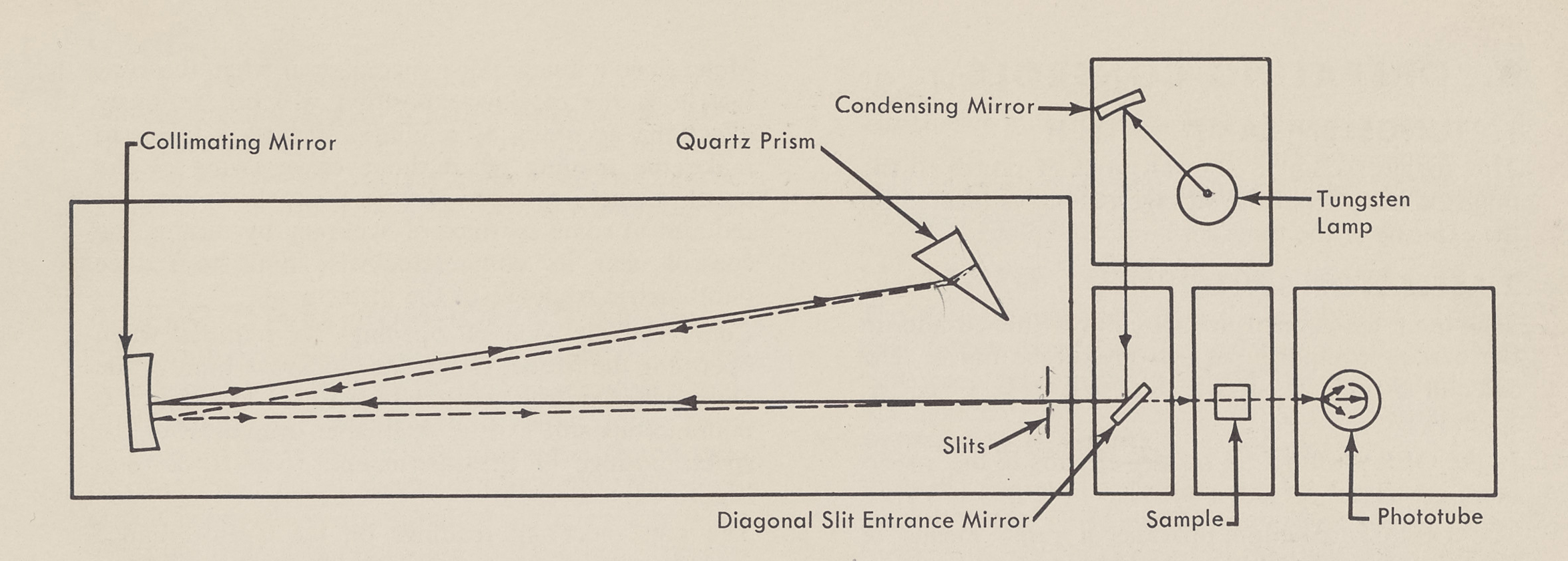
Diagram of Model DU optical system, Beckman manual, 1954

"Light from the tungsten lamp is focused by the condensing mirror and directed in a beam to the diagonal slit entrance mirror. The entrance mirror deflects the light through the entrance slit and into the monochromator to the collimating mirror. Light falling on the collimating mirror is rendered parallel and reflected to the quartz prism where it undergoes refraction. The back surface of the prism is aluminized so that light refracted at the first surface is reflected back through the prism, undergoing further refraction as it emerges from the prism. The desired wavelength of light is selected by rotating the Wavelength Selector which adjusts the position of the prism. The spectrum is directed back to the collimating mirror which centers the chosen wavelength on the exit slit and sample. Light passing through the sample strikes the phototube, causing a current gain. The current gain is amplified and registered on the null meter." Model DU Optical System

Although the default light source for the instrument was tungsten, a hydrogen or mercury lamp could be substituted depending on the optimal range of measurement for which the instrument was to be used. The tungsten lamp was suitable for transmittance of wavelengths between 320 and 1000 millimicrons; the hydrogen lamp for 220 to 320 millimicrons, and the mercury lamp for checking the calibration of the spectrophotometer.

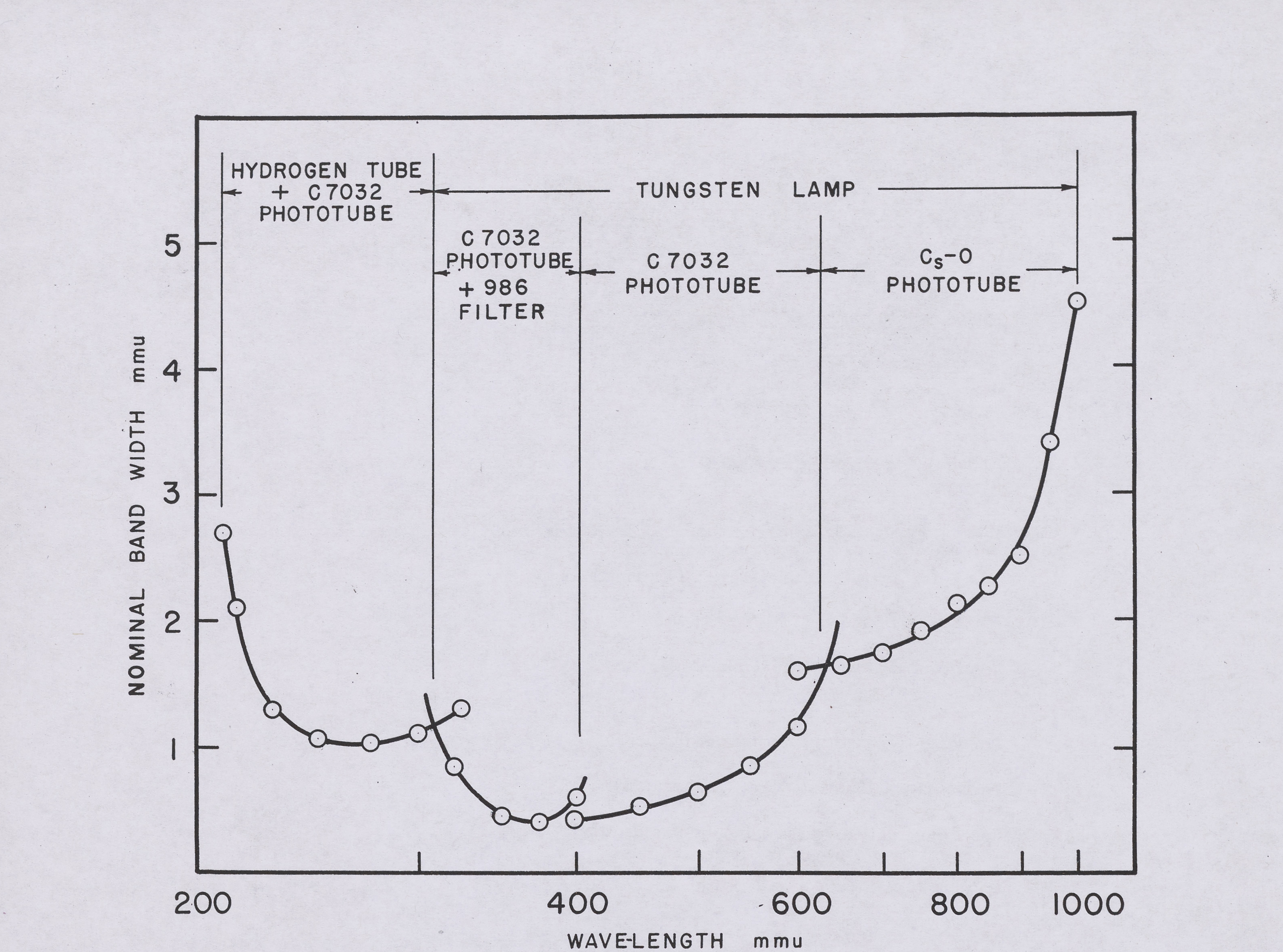
Minimum spectral band widths, Cary & Beckman, 1941

As advertised in the 1941 News Edition of the American Chemical Society, the Beckman Spectrophotometer used an autocollimating quartz crystal prism for a monochromator, capable of covering a range from the ultraviolet (200 millimicrons) to the infrared (2000 millimicrons), with a nominal bandwidth of 2 millimicrons or less for most of its spectral range. The slit mechanism was continuously adjustable from .01 to 2.0 mm and claimed to have less than 1/10% of stray light over most of the spectral range. It featured an easy-to-read wavelength scale, simultaneously reporting % Transmission and Density information.

The sample holder held up to 4 cells. Cells could be moved into the light path via an external control, allowing the user to take multiple readings without opening the cell compartment. As described in the DU's manual, absorbance measurements of a sample were made in comparison to a blank, or standard, "a solution identical in composition with the sample except that the absorbing material being measured is absent." The standard could be a cell filled with a solvent such as distilled water or a prepared solvent of a known concentration. At each wavelength two measurements are made: with the sample and with the standard in the light beam. This enables the ratio, transmittance, to be obtained. For quantitative measurements transmittance is converted to absorbance which is proportional to the solute concentration according to Beer's law. This makes possible the quantitative determination of the amount of a substance in solution.

The user could also switch between phototubes without removing the sample holder. A 1941 advertisement indicates that three types of phototubes were available, with maximum sensitivity to red, blue and ultraviolet light ranges.

The 1954 DU spectrophotometer differs in that it claims to be useful from 200 to 1000 millimicrons, and does not mention the ultraviolet phototube. The wavelength selector, however, still ranged from 200 to 2000 millimicrons. and an "Ultraviolet accessory set" was available. This shift away from using the DU for infrared measurement is understandable, since by 1954 Beckman Instruments was marketing a separate infrared spectrophotometer. Beckman developed the IR-1 infrared spectrophotometer during World War II, and redesigned it as the IR-4 between 1953 and 1956.

== Use ==
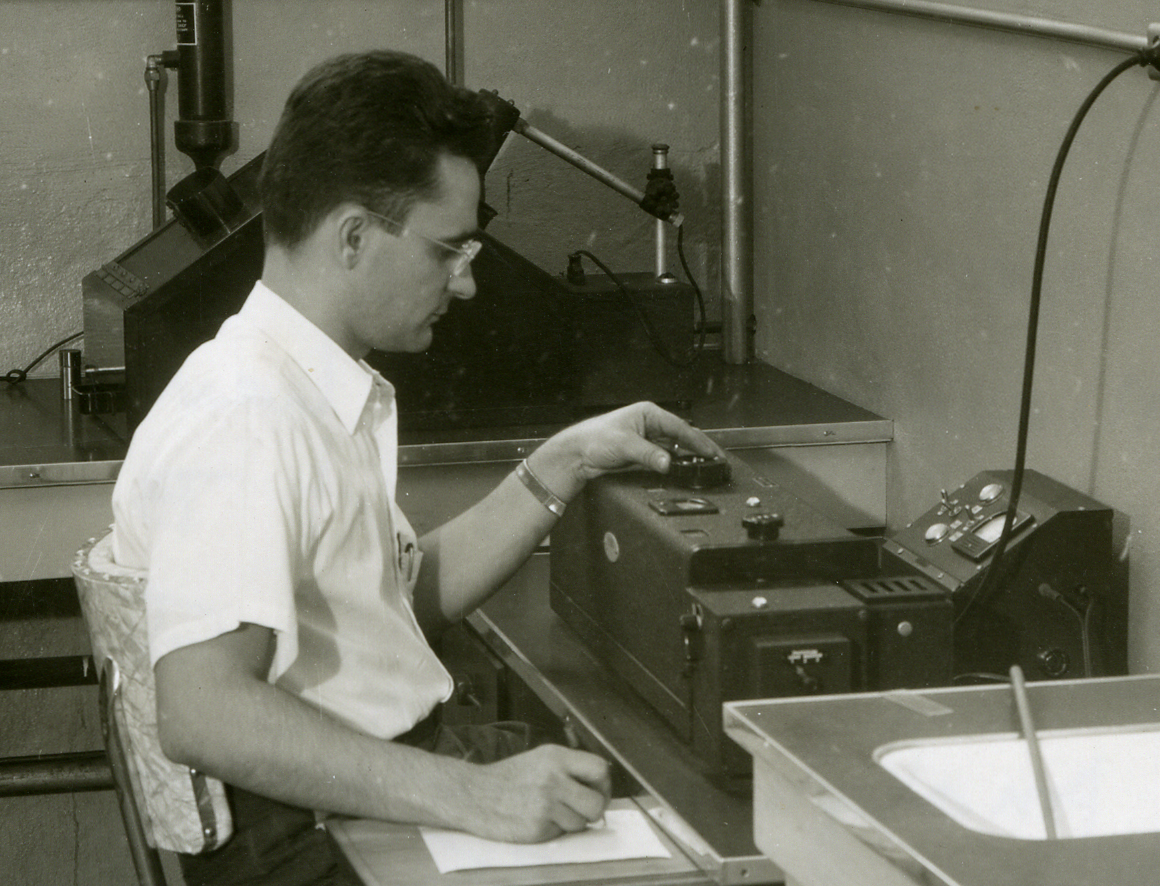
Beckman DU spectrophotometer in use

The Beckman spectrophotometer was the first easy-to-use single instrument containing both the optical and electronic components needed for ultraviolet-absorption spectrophotometry within a single housing. The user could insert a cell tray with standard and sample cells, dial up the desired wavelength of light, confirm that the instrument was properly set by measuring the standard, and then measure the amount of absorption of the sample, reading the frequency from a simple meter. A series of readings at different wavelengths could be taken without disturbing the sample. The DU spectrophotometer's manual scanning method was extremely fast, reducing analysis times from weeks or hours to minutes.

It was accurate in both the visible and ultraviolet ranges. Working in both the ultraviolet and the visible regions of the spectrum, the model DU produced accurate absorption spectra which could be obtained with relative ease and accurately replicated. The National Bureau of Standards ran tests to certify that the DU's results were accurate and repeatable and recommended its use.

Other advantages included its high resolution and the minimization of stray light in the ultraviolet region. Although it was not cheap, its initial price of $723 made it available to the average laboratory. In comparison, in 1943, the GE Hardy Spectrophotometer cost $6,400. Practical and reliable, the DU rapidly established itself as a standard for laboratory equipment.

== Impact ==
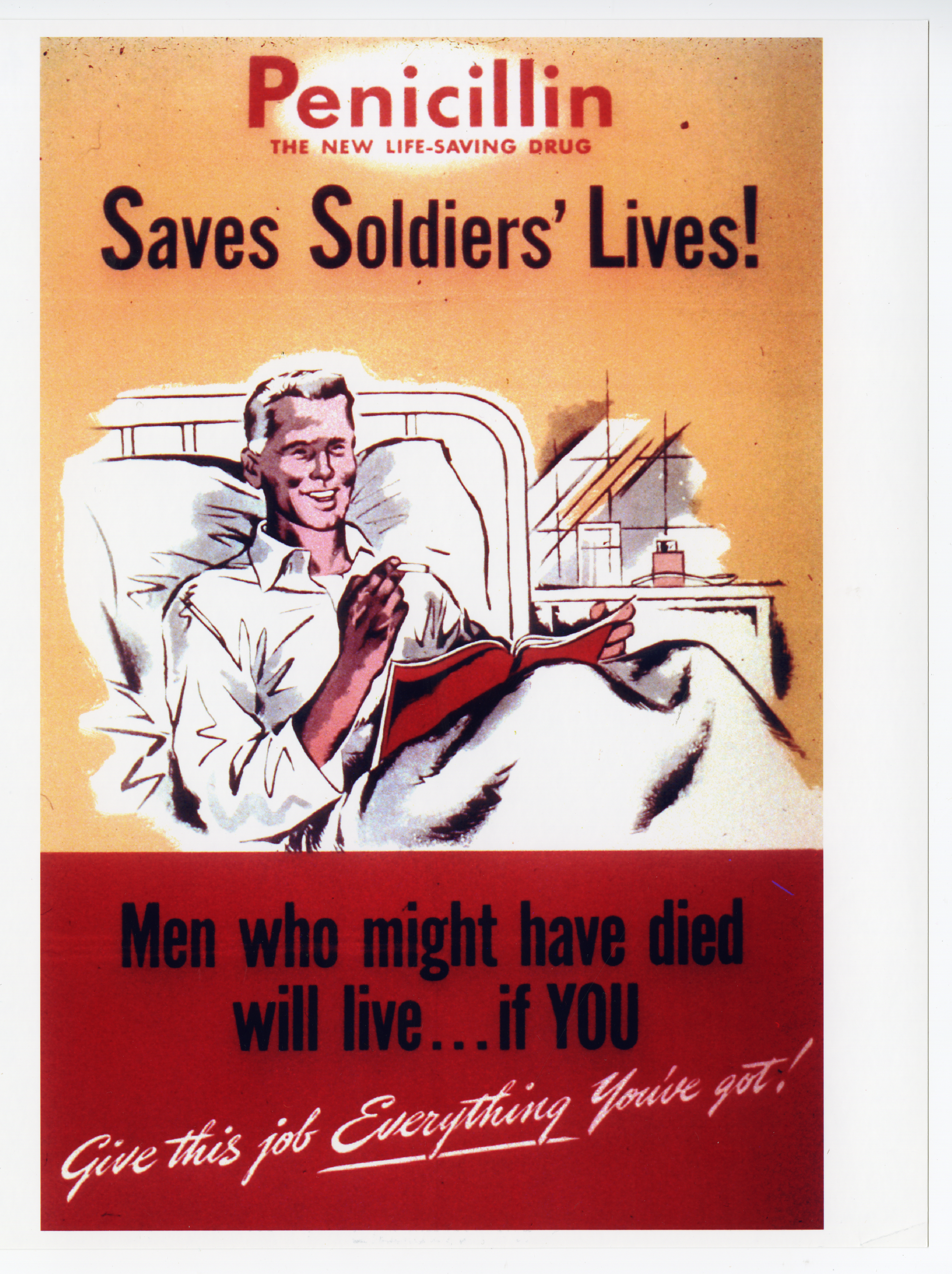
World War II poster encouraged researchers to "Give this job Everything You've got"

Credited with having "brought about a breakthrough in optical spectroscopy", the Beckman DU has been identified as "an indispensable tool for chemistry" and "the Model T of laboratory instruments". Approximately 30,000 DU spectrophotometers were manufactured and sold between 1941 and 1976.

The DU enabled researchers to perform easier analysis of substances by quickly taking measurements at more than one wavelength to produce an absorption spectrum describing the complete substance. For example, the standard method of analysis of the vitamin A content of shark liver oil, before the introduction of the DU spectrophotometer, involved feeding the oil to rats for 21 days, then cutting off the rats' tails and examining their bone structure. With the DU's UV technology, vitamin A content of shark liver oil could be determined directly in a matter of minutes.

The Scripps Research Institute and the Massachusetts Institute of Technology credit the DU with improving both accuracy and speed of chemical analysis. MIT states: "This device forever simplified and streamlined chemical analysis, by allowing researchers to perform a 99.9% accurate quantitative measurement of a substance within minutes, as opposed to the weeks required previously for results of only 25% accuracy."

Inorganic chemist and philosopher of science Theodore L. Brown states that it "revolutionized the measurement of light signals from samples". Nobel laureate Bruce Merrifield is quoted as calling the DU spectrophotometer "probably the most important instrument ever developed towards the advancement of bioscience." Historian of science Peter J. T. Morris identifies the introduction of the DU and other scientific instruments in the 1940s as the beginning of a Kuhnian revolution.

For the Beckman company, the DU was one of three foundational inventions – the pH meter, the DU spectrophotometer, and the helipot potentiometer – that established the company on a secure financial basis and enabled it to expand.

=== Vitamins ===
Development of the spectrophotometer had direct relevance to World War II and the American war effort. The role of vitamins in health was of significant concern, as scientists wanted to identify Vitamin A-rich foods to keep soldiers healthy. Previous methods of assessing Vitamin A levels involved feeding rats a food for several weeks and then performing a biopsy to estimate ingested Vitamin A levels. In contrast, examining a food sample with a DU spectrophotometer yielded better results in a matter of minutes. The DU spectrophotometer could be used to study both vitamin A and its precursor carotenoids, and rapidly became the preferred method of spectrophotometric analysis.

=== Penicillin ===
The DU spectrophotometer was also an important tool for scientists studying and producing the new wonder drug penicillin. The development of penicillin was a secret national mission, involving 17 drug companies, with the goal of providing penicillin to all U.S. Forces engaged in World War II. It was known that penicillin was more effective than sulfa drugs, and that its use reduced mortality, severity of long-term wound trauma, and recovery time. However, its structure was not understood, isolation procedures used to create pure cultures were primitive, and production using known surface culture techniques was slow.

At Northern Regional Research Laboratory in Peoria, Illinois, researchers collected and examined more than 2,000 specimens of molds (as well as other microorganisms). An extensive research team included Robert Coghill, Norman Heatley, Andrew Moyer, Mary Hunt, Frank H. Stodola and Morris E. Friedkin. Friedkin recalls that an early model of the Beckman DU spectrophotometer was used by the penicillin researchers in Peoria. The Peoria lab was successful in isolating and commercially producing superior strains of the mold, which were 200 times more effective than the original forms discovered by Alexander Fleming. By the end of the war, American pharmaceutical companies were producing 650 billion units of penicillin each month. Much of the work done in this area during World War II was kept secret until after the war.

=== Hydrocarbons ===
The DU spectrophotometer was also used for critical analysis of hydrocarbons. A number of hydrocarbons were of interest to the war effort. Toluene, a hydrocarbon in crude oil, was used in production of TNT for military use. Benzene and butadienes were used in the production of synthetic rubber. Rubber, used in tires for jeeps, airplanes and tanks, was in critically short supply because the United States was cut off from foreign supplies of natural rubber. The Office of Rubber Reserve organized researchers at universities and in industry to secretly work on the problem. The demand for synthetic rubber caused Beckman Instruments to develop infrared spectrophotometers. Infrared spectrophotometers were better suited than UV–Vis spectrophotometers to the analysis of C_{4} hydrocarbons, particularly for applications in petroleum refining and gasoline production.

=== Enzyme assays and DNA research ===
Gerty Cori and her husband Carl Ferdinand Cori won the Nobel Prize in Physiology or Medicine in 1947 in recognition of their work on enzymes. They made several discoveries critical to understanding carbohydrate metabolism, including the isolation and discovery of the Cori ester, glucose 1-phosphate, and the understanding of the Cori cycle. They determined that the enzyme phosphorylase catalyzes formation of glucose 1-phosphate, which is the beginning and ending step in the conversions of glycogen into glucose and blood glucose to glycogen. Gerty Cori was also the first to show that a defect in an enzyme can be the cause of a human genetic disease. The Beckman DU spectrophotometer was used in the Cori laboratory to calculate enzyme concentrations, including phosphorylase.

Another researcher who spent six months in 1947 at the Cori laboratory, "the most vibrant place in biochemistry" at that time, was Arthur Kornberg. Kornberg was already familiar with the DU spectrophotometer, which he had used at Severo Ochoa's laboratory at New York University. The "new and scarce" Beckman DU, loaned to Ochoa by the American Philosophical Society, was highly prized and in constant use. Kornberg used it to purify aconitase, an enzyme in the citric acid cycle.

"The enzyme could be assayed in a few minutes by coupling it to isocitrate dehydrogenase and in measuring the NADH formed using the Beckman DU spectrophotometer, an instrument that transformed biochemistry."

Kornberg and Bernard L. Horecker used the Beckman DU spectrophotometer for enzyme assays measuring NADH and NADPH. They determined their extinction coefficients, establishing a basis for quantitative measurements in reactions involving nucleotides. This work became one of the most cited papers in biochemistry. Kornberg went on to study nucleotides in DNA synthesis, isolating the first DNA polymerizing enzyme (DNA polymerase I) in 1956 and receiving the Nobel Prize in Physiology or Medicine with Severo Ochoa in 1959.

The bases of DNA absorbed ultraviolet light near 260 nm. Inspired by the work of Oswald Avery on DNA, Erwin Chargaff used a DU spectrophotometer in the 1940s in measuring the relative concentrations of bases in DNA. Based on this research, he formulated Chargaff's rules. In the first complete quantitative analysis of DNA, he reported the near-equal correspondence of pairs of bases in DNA, with the number of guanine units equaling the number of cytosine units, and the number of adenine units equaling the number of thymine units. He further demonstrated that the relative amounts of guanine, cytosine, adenine and thymine varied between species. In 1952, Chargaff met Francis Crick and James D. Watson, discussing his findings with them. Watson and Crick built upon his ideas in their determination of the structure of DNA.

=== Biotechnology ===
Ultraviolet spectroscopy has wide applicability in molecular biology, particularly the study of photosynthesis. It has been used to study a wide variety of flowering plants and ferns by researchers in departments of biology, plant physiology and agriculture science as well as molecular genetics.

Particularly useful in detecting conjugated double bonds, the new technology made it possible for researchers like Ralph Holman and George O. Burr to study dietary fats, work that had significant implications for human diet. The DU spectrophotometer was also used in the study of steroids by researchers like Alejandro Zaffaroni, who helped to develop the birth control pill, the nicotine patch, and corticosteroids.

== Later models ==
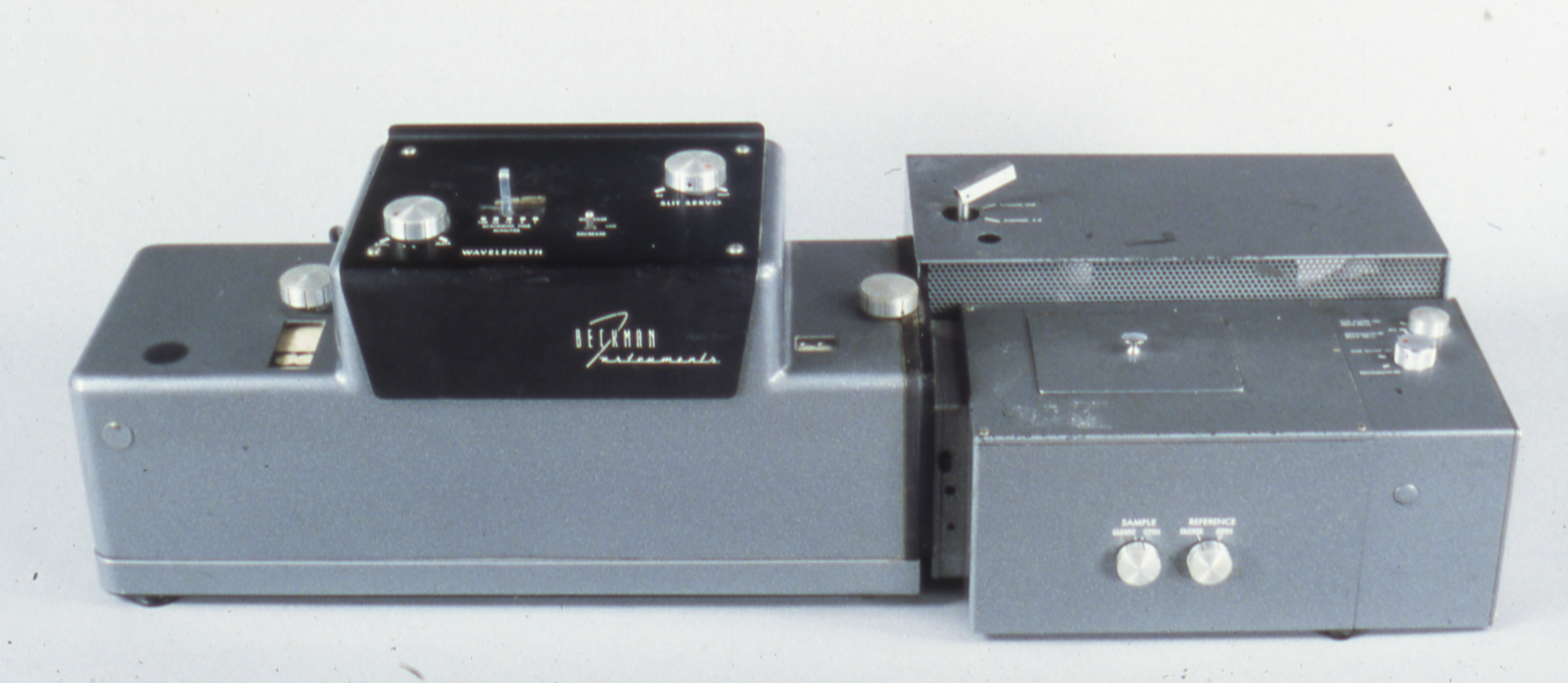
Beckman Model DK1 Ultraviolet Spectrophotometer

The Beckman team eventually developed additional models, as well as a number of accessories or attachments which could be used to modify the DU for different types of work. One of the first accessories was a flame attachment with a more powerful photo multiplier to enable the user to examine flames such as potassium, sodium and cesium (1947).

In the 1950s, Beckman Instruments developed the DR and the DK, both of which were double-beam ultraviolet spectrophotometers. The DK was named for Wilbur I. Kaye, who developed it by modifying the DU to expand its range into the near-infrared. He did the initial work while at Tennessee Eastman Kodak, and later was hired by Beckman Instruments. The DKs introduced an automatic recording feature. The DK-1 used a non-linear scroll, and the DK-2 used a linear scroll to automatically record the spectra.

The DR incorporated a "robot operator" which would reset the knobs on the DU to complete a sequence of measurements at different wavelengths, just like a human operator would to generate results for a full spectrum. It used a linear shuttle with four positions, and a superstructure to change the knobs. It had a moving chart recorder to plot results, with red, green and black dots. The price of recording spectrophotometers was substantially higher than non-recording machines.

The DK was ten times faster than the DR, but not quite as accurate. It used a photomultiplier, which had introduced a source of error. The DK's speed made it preferred to the DR. Kaye eventually developed the DKU, combining infrared and ultraviolet features in one instrument, but it was more expensive than other models.

The last DU spectrophotometer was produced on July 6, 1976. By the 1980s, computers were being incorporated into scientific instruments such as Bausch & Lomb's Spectronic 2000 UV–Vis spectrophotometer, to improve data acquisition and provide instrument control. Specialized spectrophotometers designed for specific tasks now tend to be used rather than general "all-purpose machines" like the DU.
