= Cary 14 Spectrophotometer =

UV-Vis spectrophotometer, scientific instrument

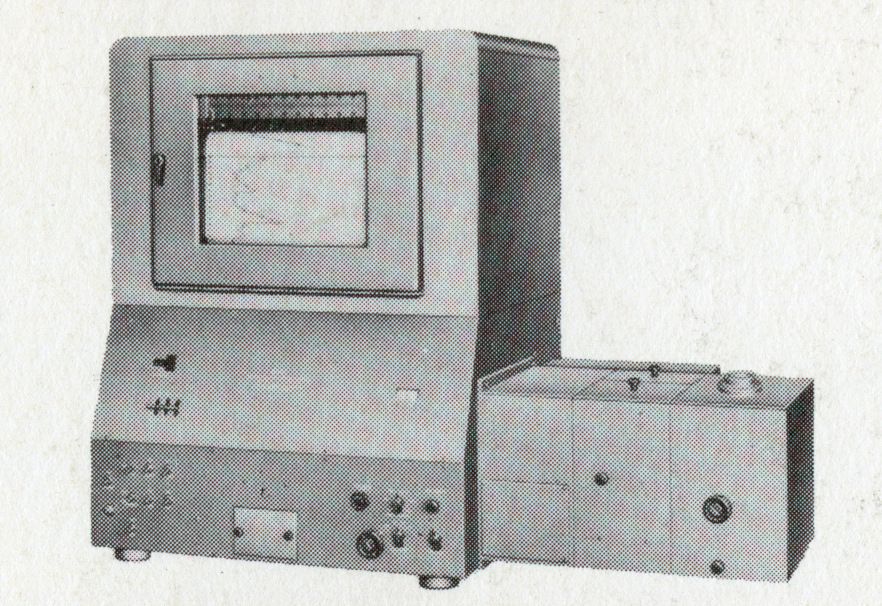
Cary Model 14B Recording Spectrophotometer (front, details almost identical to Model 14)

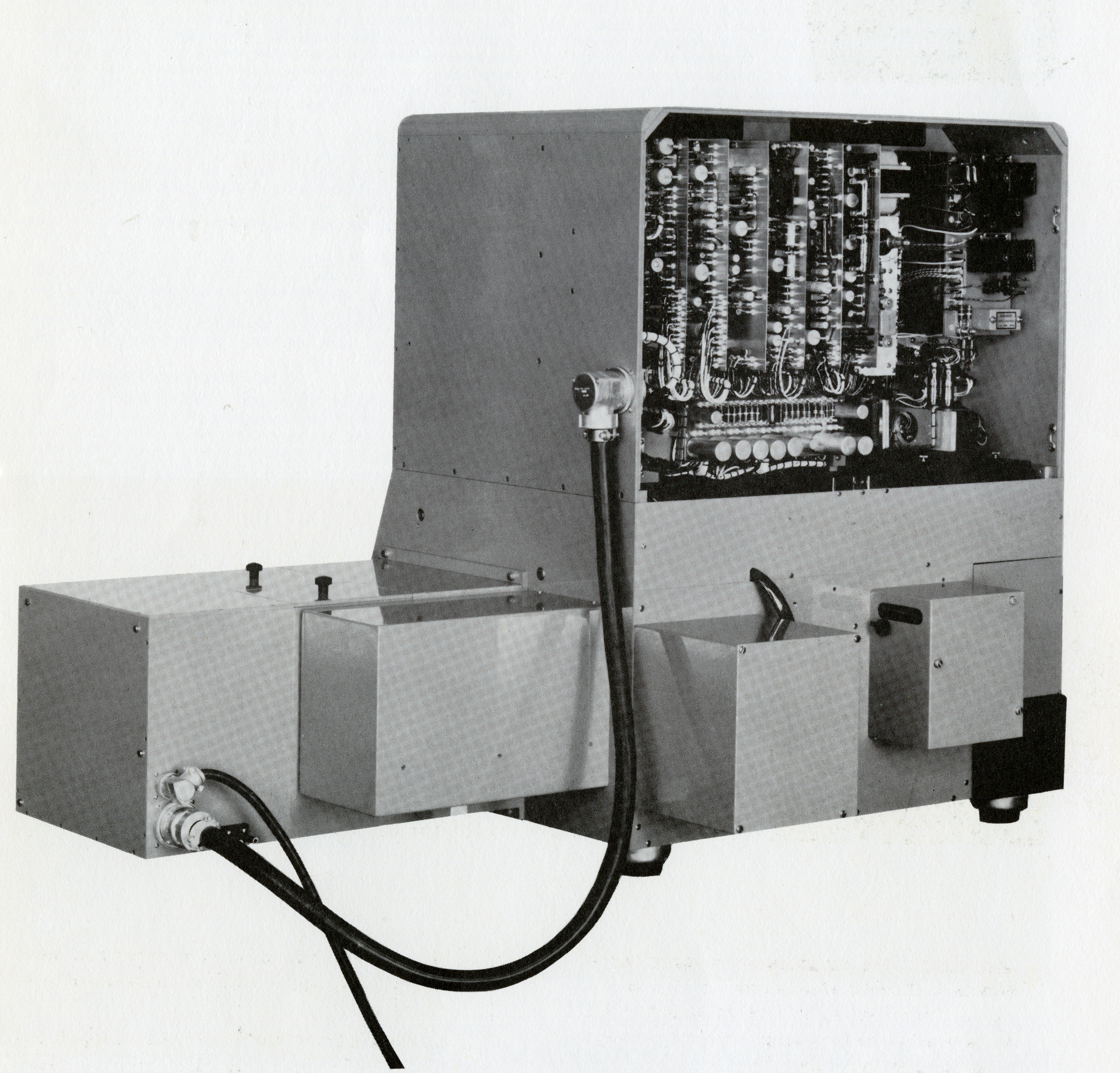
Cary Model 14 Recording Spectrophotometer (back, open)

The Cary Model 14 UV-VIS Spectrophotometer was a double beam recording spectrophotometer designed to operate over the wide spectral range of ultraviolet, visible and near infrared wavelengths (UV/Vis/NIR). This included wavelengths ranging from 185 nanometers to 870 nanometers. (The Cary Model 14B, almost identical in exterior appearance, measured wavelengths from .5 to 6.0 microns.)

The Cary 14 spectrophotometer was first produced in 1954 by the Applied Physics Corporation, which later was named the Cary Instruments Corporation after co-founder Howard Cary. The instrument was a successor to the Cary 11, which was the first commercially available recording UV/Vis spectrophotometer. It was produced until 1980, and refurbished models can still be obtained.

== Design and use ==
The double beam design of the Cary 14 provided rapid, simplified analysis by simultaneously measuring the transmittance of both the sample and the reference over the entire spectral range. The optics of the Cary 14 were a key feature. The double monochromator in particular was described and patented. The Cary 14 was one of the first instruments to incorporate high-quality gratings into its monochromators.

To take readings in the ultraviolet or visible range, either a deuterium or tungsten lamp was used, with the light focussed into the entrance slit. The light passed through the first monochromator, which used a 30° Littrow prism, through the intermediate slit, and then into the second monochromator, which used an echelette grating with 6000 grooves/cm, to the exit slit. The beam from the monochromator then reflected from a rotating semicircular mirror and beam chopper, sending the light alternately into compartments for the sample and the reference, separated by dark periods. The beams from the sample and reference alternately registered on the single photomultiplier (pmt) detector, with the pmt output in the dark intervals subtracted from both measurements. The measured absorption or transmittance was calculated from the difference in the dark-corrected sample and reference measurements.

To take readings in the near infrared, a tungsten ribbon-filament lamp was used instead of the photomultiplier tube. An additional mirror was used to direct the light beam onto a lead sulfide photoconductive cell and reverse the light's path through the monochromators.

The instrument had a built-in chart recorder for displaying the analog signal on paper. By using a double-pen mechanism, an effective chart width of 20 inches could be obtained. The original hydrogen discharge lamp was water cooled. Samples and reference solvent were held in the sample chambers by a variety of means, most typically using 1 centimeter pathlength cuvettes made of glass or quartz.

By combining the Littrow prism and the echelette grating, the Cary design minimized noise and interference (stray light) while obtaining high resolution measurements over a very wide dynamic range. When used in double-beam mode, the instrument was almost entirely free from Wood’s anomalies and other artifacts. A series of publications in the scholarly literature validated the optical quality of the Cary 14, including benchmarking with the Beckman DU Spectrophotometer, which was another leading spectrophotometer of the time.

The instrument was widely used for studies of chemical bonding, quantitative analysis, and rates of chemical reaction. The use of the instrument generally necessitated that substances being studied are in the solution state. Integrating sphere accessories were available which enabled diffuse reflectance measurements,

Patent USRE26053 E Cary 14 Spectrophotometer
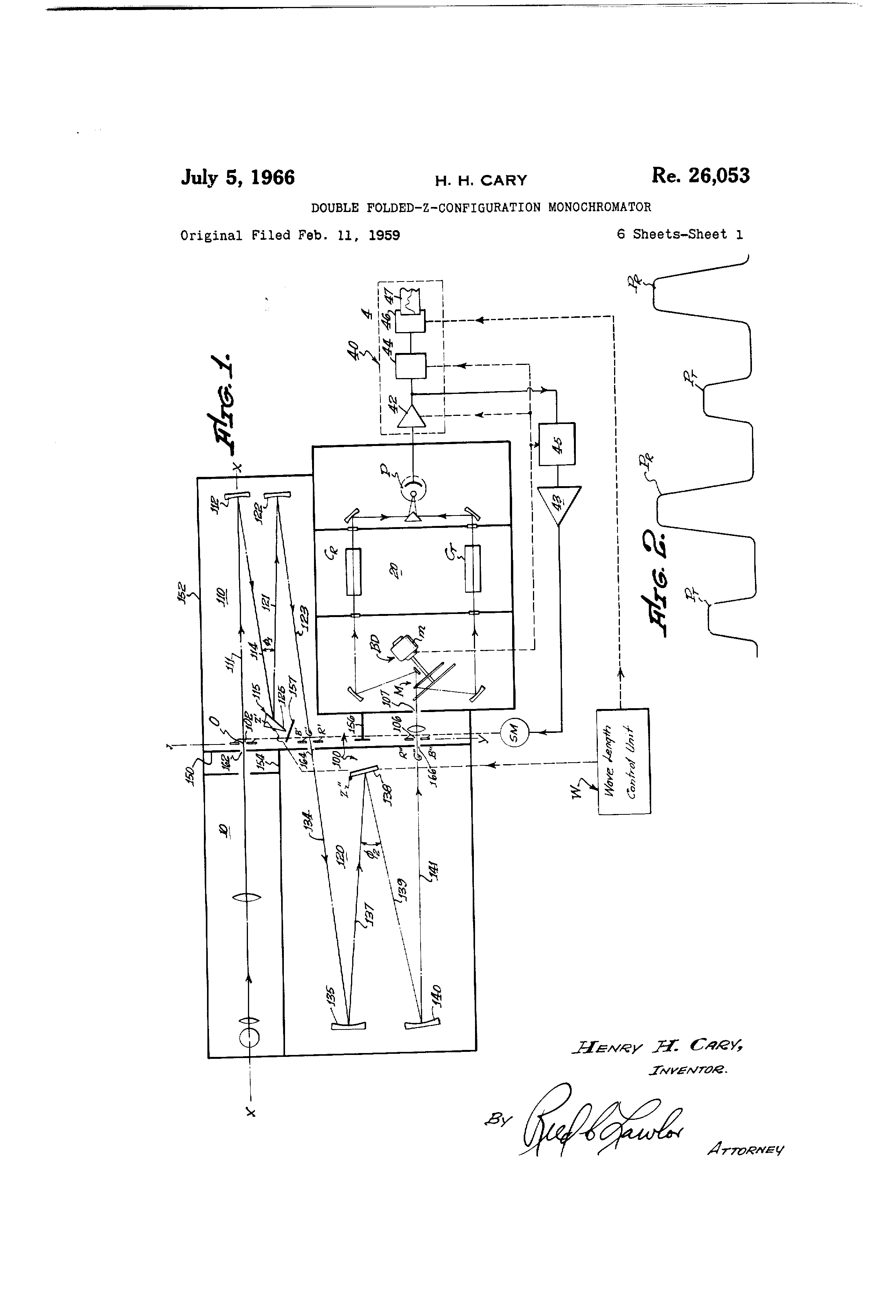
Schematic diagram of the Monochromator

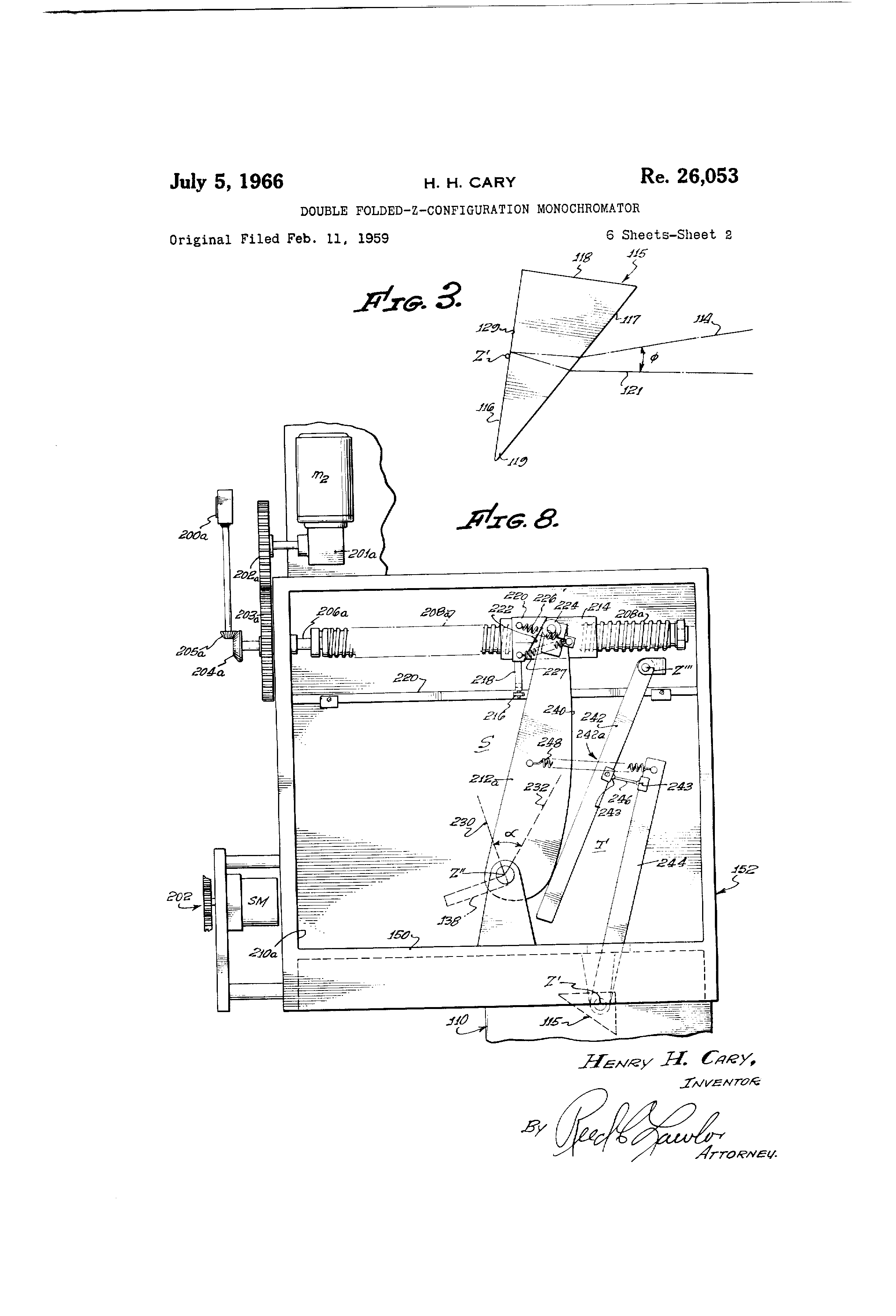
Plan View of the Monochromator

== Production ==
The Cary 14 was produced until 1980. Its selling price in 1960 was approximately US $20,000. Cary Instruments replaced production of the Cary 14 with the Cary 17 beginning in 1970. Cary recording spectrophotometers, including the Cary 14, were contemporary to the single beam, non-scanning Spectronic 20 spectrophotometer. These instruments were complementary and were used in academic and analytical settings through the 1950s, 1960s, and 1970s.

Although the Cary 14 is out of production, refurbished versions of it that retain the original optics but with an air cooled deuterium lamp, a lead-sulphide IR detector, modernized, digital electronics and recording, automatic lamp and detector change at selected wavelengths, extensive accessories, and flexible operation automation that includes the ability to integrate the instrument into a larger system are commercially available as of 2017. Versions of modernized Cary 14 spectrophotometers extend the wavelength range to 2500 nanometers in the near infrared spectrum.
