= Cary Instruments =

Cary Instruments was founded in 1946 by Howard Cary, George W. Downs, and William C. Miller under the name Applied Physics Corporation. Howard Cary had previously been vice president in charge of development for National Technologies Laboratories (later to become Beckman instruments and eventually Beckman Coulter), where he had worked on the development of the DU line of UV/Vis Spectrophotometers.

The Applied Physics Corporation, subsequently renamed to Cary Instruments company, became well known as a supplier of high-quality optical instrumentation for scientific laboratories. The company was purchased in 1966 by Varian Associates, at which time it became known as the Cary Instruments division. In 1982 the Cary division was merged with the Techtron division of Varian and moved to Melbourne Australia. The Cary brand is still retained to the present day for UV/Vis Spectrophotometers, Fluorometers and FTIR spectrometers, even after the acquisition of Varian, Inc. by Agilent Technologies in 2010.

== Scientific instruments ==
The following are some of the scientific instruments developed by Cary Instruments.

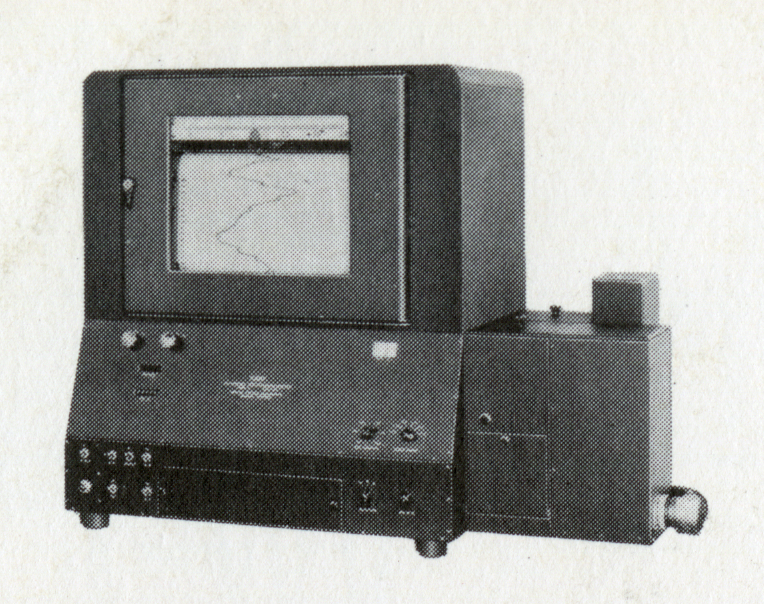
Cary Model 11 Recording Spectrophotometer

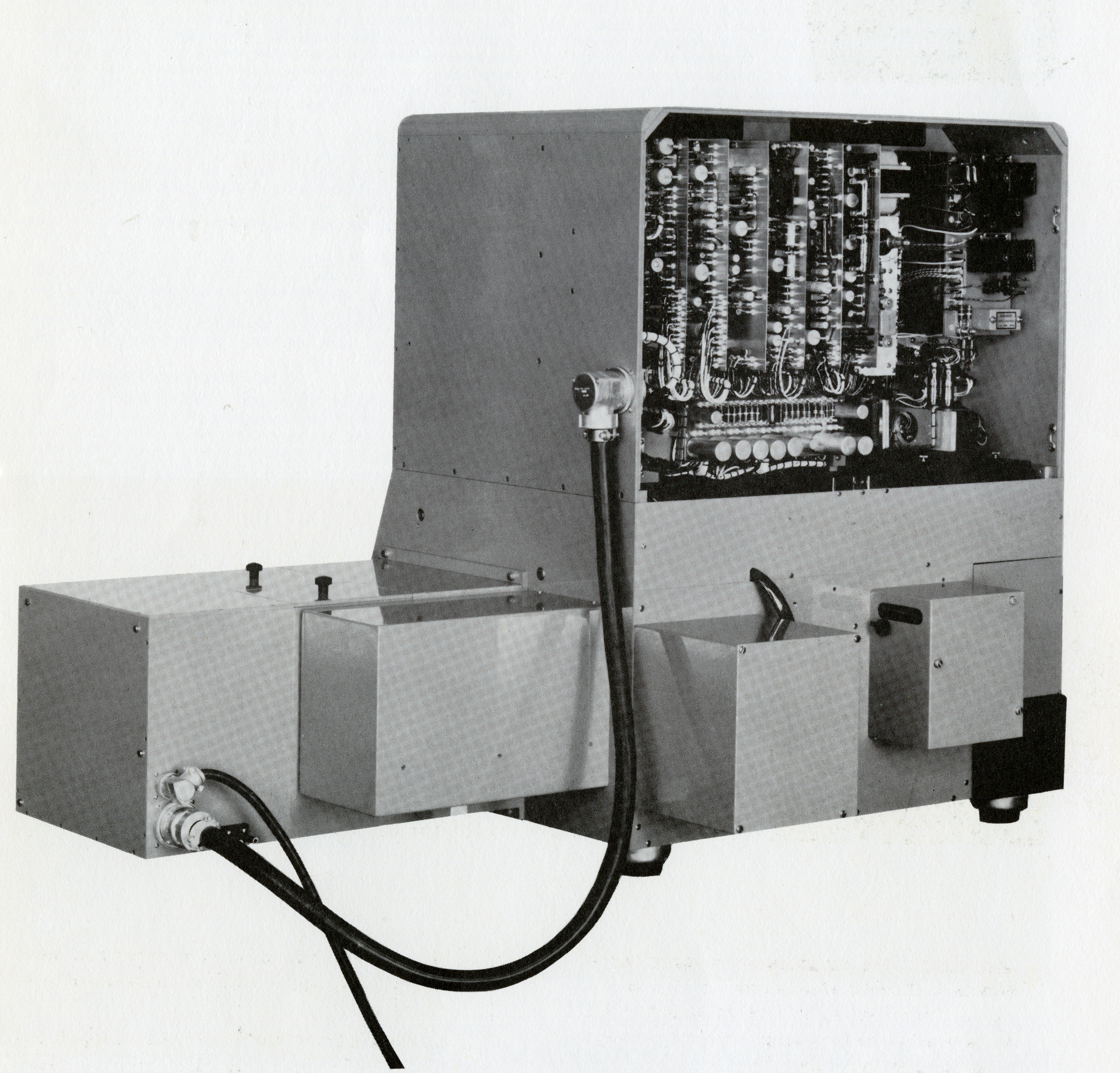
Cary Model 14 Recording Spectrophotometer (back open)

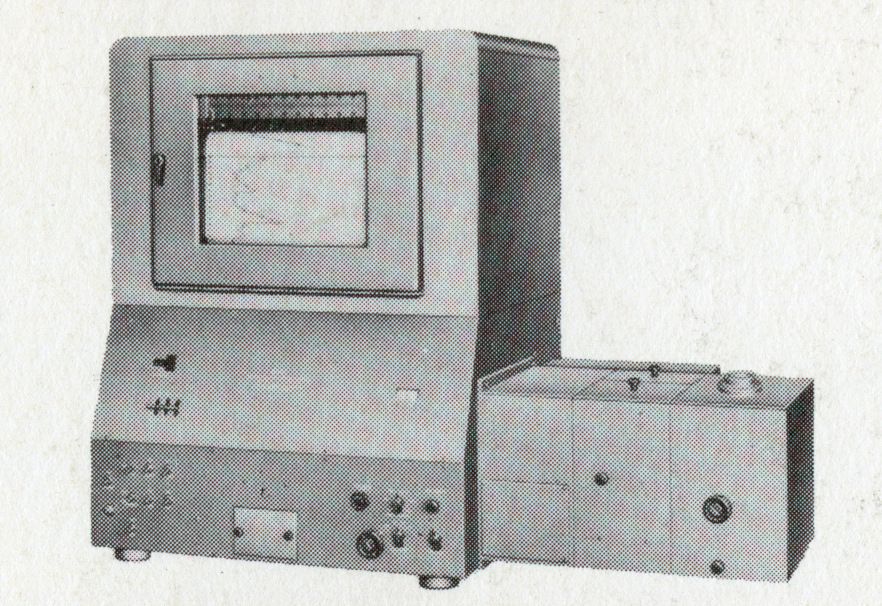
Model 14B Recording Spectrophotometer (front)

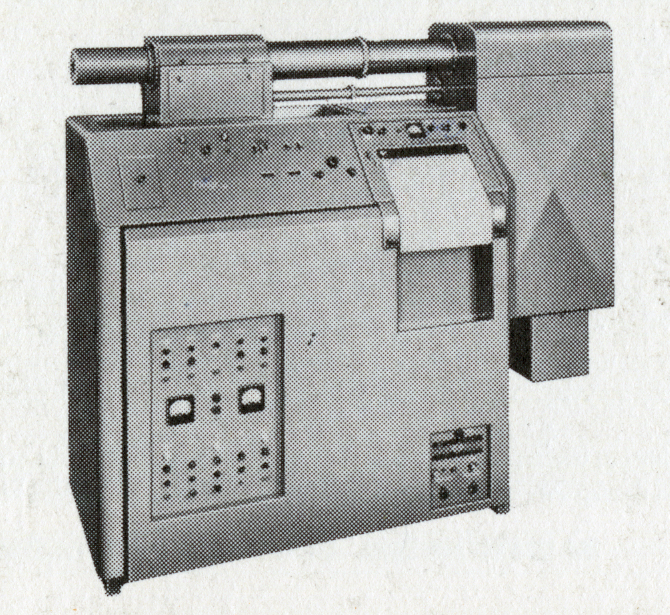
Cary Model 81 Raman Spectrophotometer

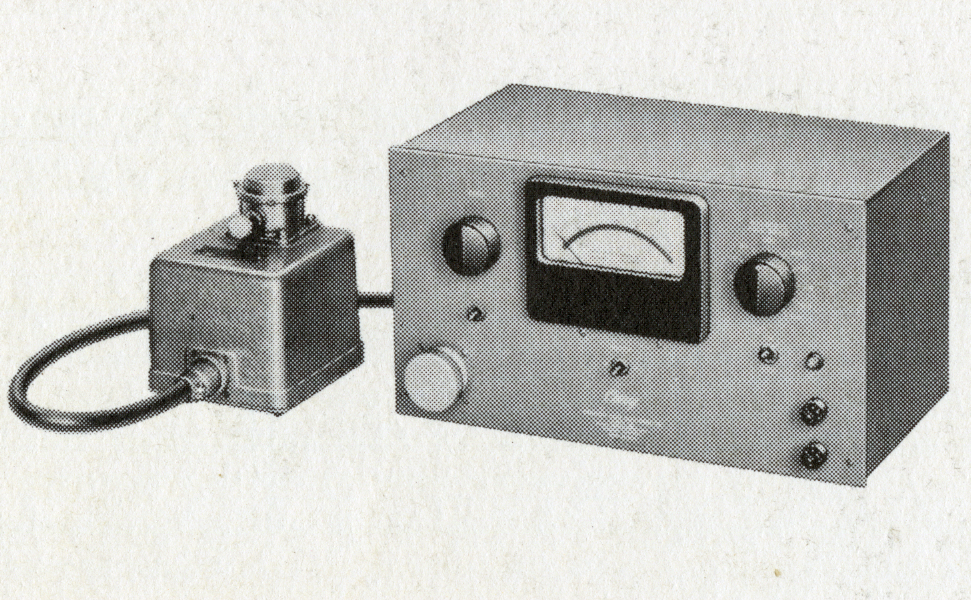
Cary Model 31 Electrometer

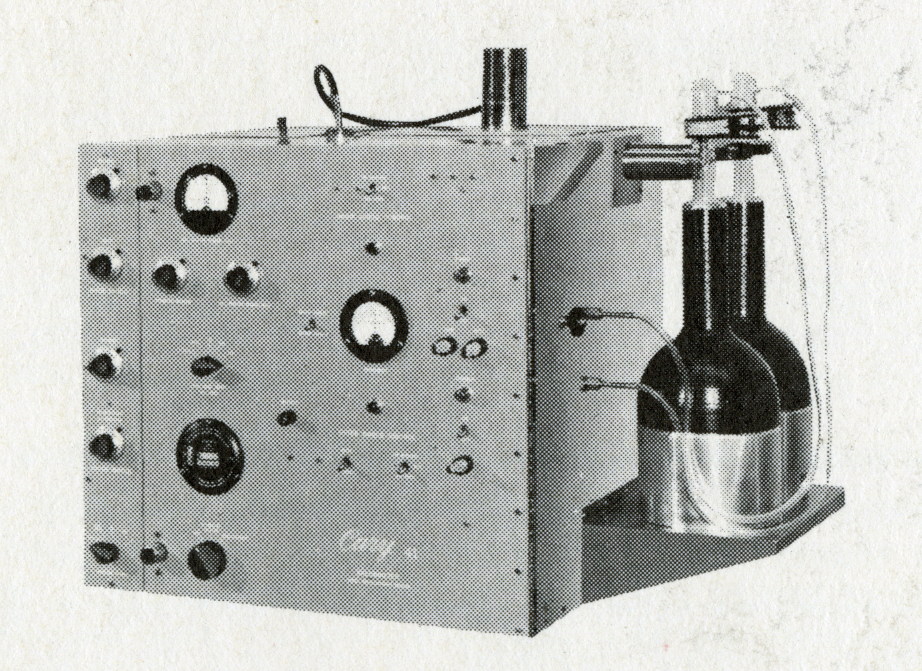
Cary Model 41 Calorimeter
