= John Torrence Tate Sr. =

American physicist (1889–1950)

John Tate
- Born: John Torrence Tate; July 28, 1889; Lenox, Iowa, US
- Died: May 27, 1950 (aged 60); Minneapolis, Minnesota, US
- Education: University of Nebraska (BS, MA); University of Berlin (Dr. phil.)
- Children: John Torrence Tate Jr.
- Scientific career
- Fields: Physics
- Workplaces: University of Nebraska (1914–16); University of Minnesota (1916–50)
- Doctoral advisor: James Franck
- Doctoral students: Walter M. Nielsen (1925); Walter Brattain (1929); Walker Bleakney (1930); Alfred Otto Carl Nier (1936); Homer Hagstrum (1940)

John Torrence Tate Sr. (July 28, 1889 – May 27, 1950) was an American physicist and scientific journalist noted for his editorship of Physical Review between 1926 and 1950. He was also the father of mathematician John Torrence Tate Jr.

== Biography ==
John Torrence Tate was born on July 28, 1889, in Lenox, Iowa. He studied electrical engineering at the University of Nebraska, earning a B.S. in 1910. Shifting his focus to physics, he obtained an M.A. in 1912. He then departed for Germany to study at the University of Berlin, where he received his Ph.D. under James Franck in 1914 with a thesis on the vaporization of metals.

Tate returned to the University of Nebraska as a faculty member, staying until 1916, when he became Instructor in Physics at the University of Minnesota. With the exception of brief sabbaticals to conduct war-related work, he remained at Minnesota until his death in 1950. Tate Laboratory of Physics at the University of Minnesota is named in his honor.

== Editor of Physical Review ==
While a professor at the University of Minnesota, Tate presided over the growth of Physical Review into a high impact journal. Physicist John H. Van Vleck, who was a colleague of Tate's at Minnesota from 1923 to 1928, recalled that in the early 20th century "The Physical Review was only so-so, especially in theory, and in 1922 I was greatly pleased that my doctor's thesis was accepted for publication by the Philosophical Magazine in England . . . By 1930 or so, the relative standings of The Physical Review and Philosophical Magazine were interchanged." Alfred Nier and John Van Vleck credited the rapid growth of the journal's size and influence in the 1920s to Tate's sensitivity to the importance of the emerging quantum revolution, and in particular the rapidity with which he published papers relating to quantum phenomena.

== Reviewing Einstein and Rosen ==
On June 1, 1936, Tate, as the editor of the Physical Review, received a submission from Albert Einstein and Nathan Rosen. Tate sent the submission to H.P. Robertson, who made an anonymous critical peer review questioning the basic conclusion of the paper. On July 23, Tate returned the submission with the anonymous review. On July 27, Einstein replied:

We (Mr. Rosen and I) had sent you our manuscript for publication and had not authorized you to show it to specialists before it is printed. I see no reason to address the—in any case erroneous—comments of your anonymous expert. On the basis of this incident I prefer to publish the paper elsewhere.

== Legacy ==
John T. Tate Hall at the University of Minnesota, constructed in 1926, is named after Tate.
