= Walter Brattain =

American physicist (1902–1987)

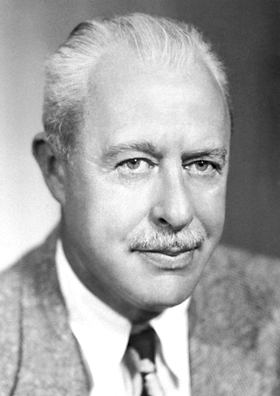
- Brattain in 1956
- Born: Walter Houser Brattain; February 10, 1902; Amoy, China
- Died: October 13, 1987 (aged 85); Seattle, Washington, U.S.
- Education: Whitman College: B.A., Physics and Mathematics; University of Oregon: M.S., Physics; University of Minnesota: Ph.D., Physics
- Known for: Invention of the point-contact transistor
- Spouses: Karen Gilmore (m. 1935; died 1957) Emma Jane Miller (m. 1958)
- Children: 1
- Relatives: Robert Brattain (brother)
- Awards: Stuart Ballantine Medal (1952); John Scott Award (1954); Nobel Prize in Physics (1956); Richtmyer Memorial Award (1956)
- Scientific career
- Fields: Physics
- Workplaces: Bell Labs; Whitman College
- Thesis: Efficiency of Excitation by Electron Impact and Anomalous Scattering in Mercury Vapor (1929)
- Doctoral advisor: John Torrence Tate Sr.

Walter Houser Brattain (/ˈbræt.n/ BRAT-n; February 10, 1902 – October 13, 1987) was an American physicist who shared the 1956 Nobel Prize in Physics with John Bardeen and William Shockley for their invention of the point-contact transistor. Brattain devoted much of his life to research on surface states.

== Early life and education ==
Walter Houser Brattain was born on February 10, 1902, in Amoy (now Xiamen), Fujian, China, to American parents, Ottilie (née Houser) and Ross R. Brattain. His father was of Scottish descent, while his mother's parents were both immigrants from Stuttgart, Germany. Ross was a teacher at the Ting-Wen Institute, a private school for Chinese boys. Ottilie was a gifted mathematician. Both were graduates of Whitman College. Ottilie and baby Walter returned to the United States in 1903, and Ross followed shortly afterward. The family lived for several years in Spokane, Washington, then settled on a cattle ranch near Tonasket, Washington, in 1911.

Brattain attended high school in Washington, spending one year at Queen Anne High School, two years at Tonasket High School, and one year at Moran School for Boys. He then attended Whitman College, where he studied under Benjamin H. Brown (physics) and Walter A. Bratton (mathematics). He graduated in 1924 with a double major in Physics and Mathematics. Brattain and his classmates Walker Bleakney, Vladimir Rojansky, and E. John Workman would all go on to have distinguished careers, later becoming known as "the four horsemen of physics". His brother Robert, who followed him at Whitman College, also became a physicist.

After receiving a Master of Science in Physics from the University of Oregon, Brattain went to the University of Minnesota to pursue a Doctor of Philosophy under John Torrence Tate. At Minnesota, he had the opportunity to study the new field of quantum mechanics under John Hasbrouck Van Vleck. His doctoral thesis was titled Efficiency of Excitation by Electron Impact and Anomalous Scattering in Mercury Vapor.

== Career and research ==
In 1928, Brattain took a job at the National Bureau of Standards (now the National Institute of Standards and Technology) working in the Radio Division, where he helped develop piezoelectric frequency standards. In 1929, he joined Joseph A. Becker at Bell Telephone Laboratories as a research physicist. The two men worked on the heat-induced flow of charge carriers in copper oxide rectifiers. Brattain was able to attend a lecture by Arnold Sommerfeld. Some of their subsequent experiments on thermionic emission provided experimental validation for the Sommerfeld theory. They also did work on the surface state and work function of tungsten and the adsorption of thorium atoms. Through his studies of rectification and photo-effects on the semiconductor surfaces of cuprous oxide and silicon, Brattain discovered the photo-effect at the free surface of a semiconductor. This work was considered by the Nobel Committee to be one of his chief contributions to solid-state physics.

At the time, the telephone industry was heavily dependent on the use of vacuum tubes to control electron flow and amplify current. Vacuum tubes were neither reliable nor efficient, and Bell Labs wanted to develop an alternative technology. As early as the 1930s Brattain worked with William Shockley on the idea of a semiconductor amplifier that used copper oxide, an early and unsuccessful attempt at creating a field-effect transistor. Other researchers at Bell and elsewhere were also experimenting with semiconductors, using materials such as germanium and silicon, but the pre-war research effort was somewhat haphazard and lacked strong theoretical grounding.

During World War II, both Brattain and Shockley were separately involved in research on magnetic detection of submarines with the National Defense Research Committee at Columbia University. Brattain's group developed magnetometers sensitive enough to detect anomalies in the Earth's magnetic field caused by submarines. As a result of this work, in 1944, Brattain patented a design for a magnetometer head.

In 1945, Bell Labs reorganized and created a group specifically to do fundamental research in solid-state physics, relating to communications technologies. Creation of the sub-department was authorized by the vice-president for research, Mervin Kelly. An interdisciplinary group, it was co-led by Shockley and Stanley O. Morgan. The new group was soon joined by John Bardeen. Bardeen was a close friend of Brattain's brother Robert, who had introduced John and Walter in the 1930s. They often played bridge and golf together. Bardeen was a quantum physicist, Brattain a gifted experimenter in materials science, and Shockley, the leader of their team, was an expert in solid-state physics.

=== Invention of the transistor ===
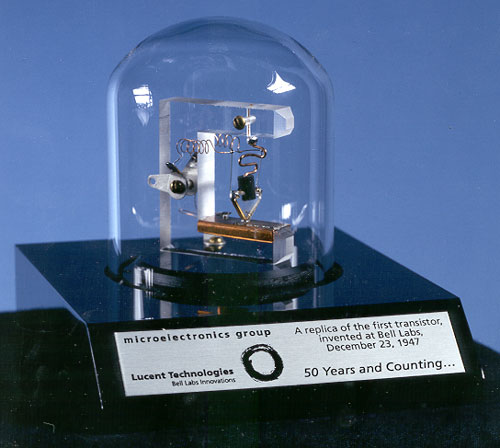
A replica of the first transistor

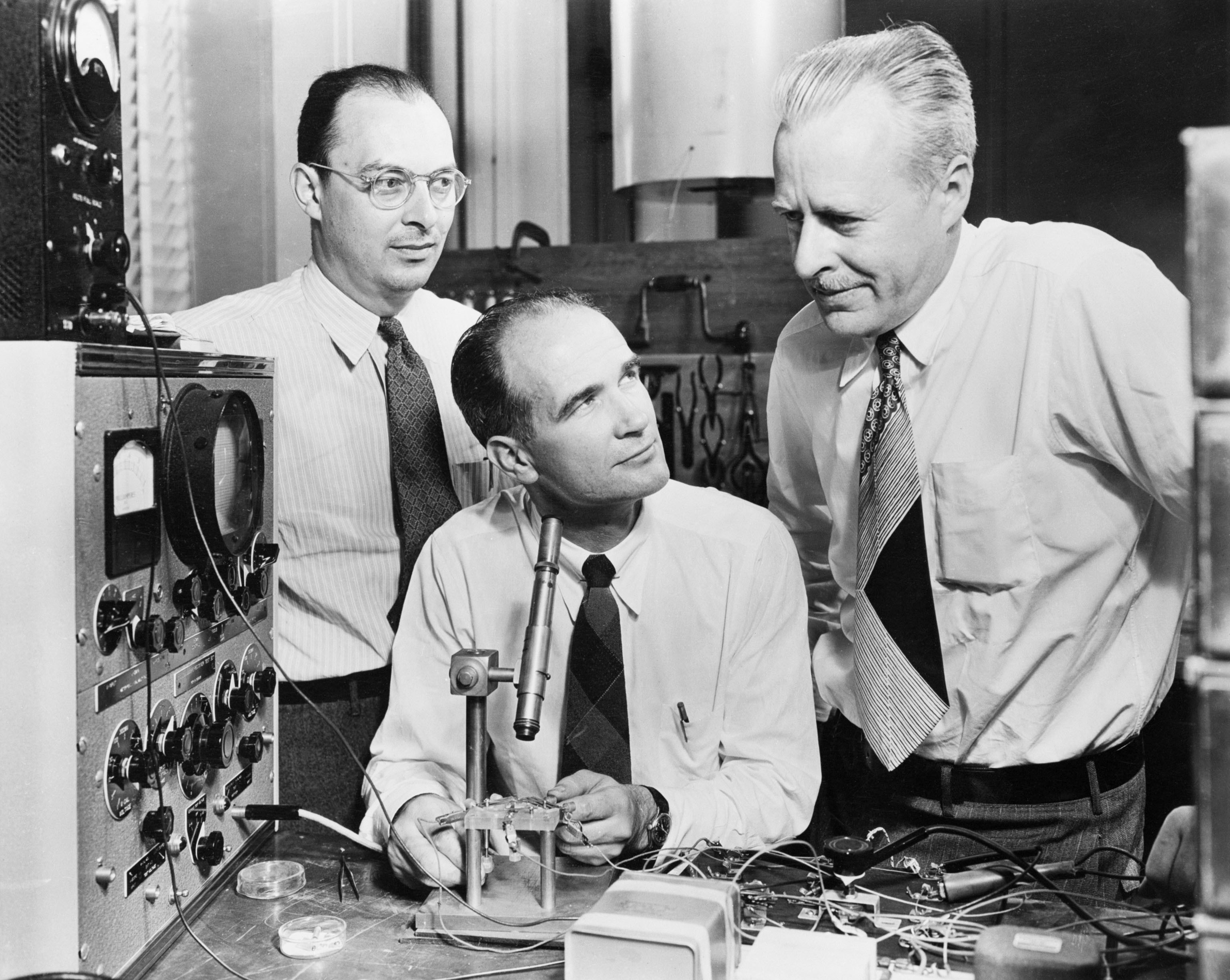
Left to right: John Bardeen, William Shockley, and Brattain at Bell Labs, 1948

According to theories of the time, Shockley's field-effect transistor, a cylinder coated thinly with silicon and mounted close to a metal plate, should have worked. He ordered Brattain and Bardeen to find out why it wouldn't. During November and December, the two men carried out a variety of experiments, attempting to determine why Shockley's device wouldn't amplify. Bardeen was a brilliant theorist; Brattain, equally importantly, "had an intuitive feel for what you could do in semiconductors". Bardeen theorized that the failure to conduct might be the result of local variations in the surface state which trapped the charge carriers. Brattain and Bardeen eventually managed to create a small level of amplification by pushing a gold metal point into the silicon, and surrounding it with distilled water. Replacing silicon with germanium enhanced the amplification, but only for low frequency currents.

On December 16, Brattain devised a method of placing two gold leaf contacts close together on a germanium surface. Brattain reported: "Using this double point contact, contact was made to a germanium surface that had been anodized to 90 volts, electrolyte washed off in H2O and then had some gold spots evaporated on it. The gold contacts were pressed down on the bare surface. Both gold contacts to the surface rectified nicely... One point was used as a grid and the other point as a plate. The bias (D.C.) on the grid had to be positive to get amplification."

As described by Bardeen, "The initial experiments with the gold spot suggested immediately that holes were being introduced into the germanium block, increasing the concentration of holes near the surface. The names emitter and collector were chosen to describe this phenomenon. The only question was how the charge of the added holes was compensated. Our first thought was that the charge was compensated by surface states. Shockley later suggested that the charge was compensated by electrons in the bulk and suggested the junction transistor geometry... Later experiments carried out by Brattain and me showed that very likely both occur in the point-contact transistor."

On December 23, 1947, Brattain, Bardeen, and Shockley demonstrated the first working transistor to their colleagues at Bell Labs. Amplifying small electrical signals and supporting the processing of digital information, the transistor is "the key enabler of modern electronics."

Convinced by the 1947 demonstration that a major breakthrough was being made, Bell Labs focused intensively on what it now called the Surface States Project. Initially, strict secrecy was observed. Carefully restricted internal conferences within Bell Labs shared information about the work of Brattain, Bardeen, Shockley and others who were engaged in related research. Patents were registered, recording the invention of the point-contact transistor by Bardeen and Brattain. There was considerable anxiety over whether Ralph Bray and Seymour Benzer, studying resistance in germanium at Purdue University, might make a similar discovery and publish before Bell Labs.

On June 30, 1948, Bell Labs held a press conference to publicly announce their discovery. They also adopted an open policy in which new knowledge was freely shared with other institutions. By doing so, they avoided classification of the work as a military secret, and made possible widespread research and development of transistor technology. Bell Labs organized several symposia, open to university, industry and military participants, which were attended by hundreds of scientists in September 1951, April 1952, and 1956. Representatives from international as well as domestic companies attended.

Shockley believed and stated that he should have received all the credit for the invention of the transistor. He actively excluded Bardeen and Brattain from new areas of research, in particular the junction transistor, which Shockley patented. Shockley's theory of the junction transistor was an "impressive achievement", pointing the way to future solid-state electronics, but it would be several years before its construction would become practically possible.

Brattain transferred to another research group within Bell Labs, working with C. G. B. Garrett, and P. J. Boddy. He continued to study the surface properties of solids and the "transistor effect," so as to better understand the various factors underlying semiconductor behavior. Describing it as "an intolerable situation," Bardeen left Bell Labs in 1951 to go to the University of Illinois, where he eventually won a second Nobel Prize for his theory of superconductivity. Shockley left Bell Labs in 1953 and went on to form Shockley Semiconductor Laboratory.

In 1956, the three men were jointly awarded the Nobel Prize in Physics by King Gustaf VI Adolf of Sweden "for their researches on semiconductors and their discovery of the transistor effect." Bardeen and Brattain were included for the discovery of the point-contact transistor; Shockley for the development of the junction transistor. Walter Brattain is credited as having said, when told of the award, "I certainly appreciate the honor. It is a great satisfaction to have done something in life and to have been recognized for it in this way. However, much of my good fortune comes from being in the right place, at the right time, and having the right sort of people to work with." Each of the three gave a lecture. Brattain spoke on Surface Properties of Semiconductors, Bardeen on Semiconductor Research Leading to the Point Contact Transistor, and Shockley on Transistor Technology Evokes New Physics.

=== Other work ===
Brattain later collaborated with P. J. Boddy and P. N. Sawyer on several papers on electrochemical processes in living matter. He became interested in blood clotting after his son required heart surgery. He also collaborated with Whitman chemistry professor David Frasco, using phospholipid bilayers as a model to study the surface of living cells and their absorption processes.

=== Teaching ===
Brattain taught at Harvard University as a visiting lecturer in 1952 and at Whitman College as a visiting lecturer in 1962 and 1963, and a visiting professor beginning in 1963. Upon formally retiring from Bell Labs in 1967, he continued to teach at Whitman, becoming an adjunct professor in 1972. He retired from teaching in 1976 but continued to be a consultant at Whitman.

At Whitman, the Walter Brattain Scholarships are awarded on a merit basis to "entering students who have achieved high academic excellence in their college preparatory work." All applicants for admission are considered for the scholarship, which is potentially renewable for four years.

== Personal life and death ==
Brattain married twice. His first wife was chemist Keren Gilmore. They were married in 1935 and had a son, William, in 1943. Keren died on April 10, 1957. The following year, Brattain married Emma Jane (Kirsch) Miller, a mother of three children.

Brattain died of Alzheimer's disease on October 13, 1987, in Seattle at the age of 85. He is buried in City Cemetery in Pomeroy, Washington.

== Recognition ==
=== Awards ===
Year	Organization	Award	Co-recipients	Citation	Ref.
1952	Franklin Institute	Stuart Ballantine Medal	John Bardeen	"For the theory of surface states in semi-conductors and the invention of the point contact transistor."	
1954	Franklin Institute; Philadelphia City Council	John Scott Award	John Bardeen	"[For the] invention of the transistor."	
1956	Royal Swedish Academy of Sciences	Nobel Prize in Physics	John Bardeen and William Shockley	"For their researches on semiconductors and their discovery of the transistor effect."	
1956	American Association of Physics Teachers	Richtmyer Memorial Award	—	—	

=== Honorary degrees ===
Year	University	Degree	Ref.
1952	University of Portland	Doctor of Laws	
1955	Union College	Doctor of Science	
1955	Whitman College	Doctor of Science	
1957	University of Minnesota	Doctor of Science	

=== Memberships ===
Year	Organization	Type	Ref.
1956	American Academy of Arts and Sciences	Member	
1959	National Academy of Sciences	Member	
