= Walker Bleakney =

American physicist (1901–1992)

- Born: February 8, 1901; Elderton, Pennsylvania, U.S.
- Died: January 15, 1992 (aged 90); Santa Barbara, California, U.S.
- Education: Whitman College; University of Minnesota
- Scientific career
- Doctoral advisor: John T. Tate

Walker Bleakney (February 8, 1901 – January 15, 1992) was an American physicist, one of inventors of mass spectrometers, and widely noted for his research in the fields of atomic physics, molecular physics, fluid dynamics, the ionization of gases, and blast waves. Bleakney was the chair of the department of physics at Princeton University. He was the head of the Princeton Ballistic Project during World War II.

== Career ==
Bleakney graduated from Whitman College in 1924 with a BS degree. He received his Ph.D. from the University of Minnesota in 1930. He then spent his entire career at Princeton University, first as a National Research Fellow, then as an instructor in 1932.

He then became an assistant professor in 1935 , an associate professor in 1938 and a full professor in 1944. During World War II he led the development of the modern shock tube. Bleakney became the chair of the department of physics in 1960, and remained in that capacity until 1967.

Along with validating the possibility that 3H could be unstable, his work also produced some of the earliest trustworthy proof of the tritium content of regular hydrogen.For example, he proved that heavy water contains traces of tritium i.e. triple-weight hydrogen (1935). In a team with other Princeton physicists he produced tritium in 1934.

== Awards and Distinctions ==
- Walker Bleakney was elected to the National Academy of Sciences in 1959
- National Research Council Fellow, 1930–32
- Citations for World War II research
- Honorary D.Sc., Whitman College, 1955
- American Academy of Arts and Sciences, 1963
- Cyrus Fogg Bracket Professor of Physics, Princeton University, 1953
- Class of 1909 Professor of Physics, Princeton University, 1963
