= Ralph Holman =

American biochemist

Ralph T. Holman (March 4, 1918 – August 15, 2012) was a biochemist whose research focused on lipids and fatty acids, especially the Omega-3 fatty acid. He is regarded as the "Father of Omega-3 fatty acids", coining the term in 1963.

A review of the work of Dr. Holman is available in the Journal of Nutrition as written by himself: Holman RT. The slow discovery of the importance of omega-3 essential fatty acids in human health. J Nutr 1998;128:427S-433S.

== Early life and education ==
Ralph Theodore Holman was born and raised in Minneapolis, Minnesota. Holman graduated from Bethel Junior College in 1937. He received a BS in biochemistry from the University of Minnesota, and an MS in biochemistry from Rutgers University. He earned a PhD in physiological chemistry from the University of Minnesota, and finished two post-doctoral fellowships in Sweden.

== Teaching ==
He was a teacher at Texas A&M, the University of Minnesota, and at the Mayo Medical School.

== Awards and recognition ==
He became a member of the National Academy of Sciences for his work on lipids and fatty acids. In 1998 he was recognized as a Distinguished Alumnus of the Year at Bethel Junior College.

== Accomplishments ==
- Associate of Arts, Bethel College, 1937
- Bachelor of Science in biochemistry, University of Minnesota
- Master of Science in biochemistry, Rutgers University
- Ph.D. in physiological chemistry
- Member of National Academy of Sciences, 1981
- Emeritus Professor of Biochemistry, University of Minnesota
- Adjunct Professor of Biochemistry, the Mayo Medical School
- President, American Oil Chemists Society, 1974–1975
- Associate Editor and Editor, Lipids
- Executive Director, University of Minnesota's Hormel Institute
- Established the Ralph T. and Karla C. Holman Endowed Program in Chemistry at Bethel College, 1991
- A. Richard Baldwin Distinguished Service Award, 2001
- American Oil Chemists Society, Health & Nutrition Division, Lifetime Achievement Award, 2004
