= Robert Brattain =

American physicist

R. Robert Brattain
- Born: May 21, 1911
- Died: November 17, 2002 (aged 91); U.S.
- Other name: Ross Robert Brattain
- Education: Whitman College, University of Washington, Princeton University
- Occupation: Physics
- Employer: Shell Development Company
- Known for: Spectrophotometry, Instrumentation
- Relatives: Walter Houser Brattain (brother)

R. Robert Brattain (May 21, 1911 – November 17, 2002) was an American physicist at Shell Development Company. He was involved in a number of secret projects during World War II. He is recognized as one of America's leading infrared spectroscopists for his work in designing several models of spectrophotometer, and for using the infrared spectrophotometer to determine the β-lactam structure of penicillin. His instrumentation work was essential to the subsequent study and understanding of structures in organic chemistry.

== Biography ==
R. Robert Brattain was born May 21, 1911, to Ross R. Brattain and Ottilie Houser Brattain. Both parents were graduates of Whitman College; Ottilie Houser Brattain was a gifted mathematician. During much of Robert Brattain's childhood, the family lived on a cattle ranch near Tonasket, Washington.

Brattain attended Whitman College in Walla Walla, Washington, following his older brother, Walter Houser Brattain. He then completed a master's degree in physics at the University of Washington in 1933. He went on to attend Princeton University, studying physics. There he met John Bardeen, a frequent bridge and bowling partner. Robert Brattain introduced John Barden to his brother, Walter Brattain, with whom Bardeen would win a Nobel Prize.

Initially interested in mathematical physics, Robert Brattain soon became interested in experimental physics. After his advisor Edward Condon suggested that he assist R. Bowling Barnes, an expert in infrared spectrometry, Brattain became fascinated with infrared research and instrument design. Brattain, Barnes, and others in the laboratory built a research-quality infrared spectrophotometer, using a rock salt prism, a strip of platinum as an infrared radiation source, a thermopile to measure radiation, and two galvanometers to display results. They used the instrument to begin studying the molecular structure of organic molecules. After Barnes left Princeton for American Cyanamid, he directed funding to Brattain and others to study the infrared absorption spectra of organic compounds such as benzene, toluene, and naphthalene.

== Shell Development Company ==
Due to financial pressures of the Great Depression, Robert Brattain left Princeton in 1938 without completing his degree. He was hired by Otto Beeck and joined Shell Development Company in Emeryville, California. There he began to use infrared spectroscopy to study the molecular structures of petroleum and related products. He was recognized as an early leader in the area. Brattain's work on C_{4} gas mixtures was "one of the first applications [of spectrophotometry] of major importance to the petroleum industry".

=== Aviation fuels ===
One of the areas Brattain studied was isomers of butane, which were used to make high-octane aviation fuel. His goal was to use infrared spectrometry as an analytical tool for industrial chemical process control, reliably measuring the isomers in petroleum mixtures.

Brattain again began to build a research-quality infrared spectrophotometer, this time incorporating the ideas of E. Bright Wilson and Harold Gershinowitz at Harvard University. By incorporating two prisms, one of rock salt and one of potassium bromide, it was possible to examine a greater range of infrared wavelengths. By 1939 Brattain was able to use his "IRS #1" to distinguish between the isomers isobutane and n-butane by measuring a single wavelength of infrared radiation. While continuing to study butanes with the IRS #1, Brattain designed a simpler model, the "IRS #2," for use in process control in Shell's refineries. He presented his designs for the IRS #1 (research) and the IRS #2 (process control) to the American Physical Society in Pasadena, California in June 1941.

After further development, Brattain proposed a new design for the IRS #4, and approached Arnold Orville Beckman at National Technical Laboratories (later Beckman Instruments) to make it. By partnering with John U. White of Standard Oil, Brattain was able to put together an order of 10 instruments - enough to convince Beckman to go into production. Beckman's chief engineer Howard Cary suggested a simplification to the design, which was approved by Brattain as the Beckman IR-1. The IR-1 used a Littrow prism mounting featuring a single rock salt prism with a mirrored back, and an analog galvanometer for presenting results. Users could quickly select between 18 specified wavelengths. Beckman Instruments shipped the first 1R-1 spectrophotometer to Shell on September 18, 1942.

=== Synthetic rubber ===
Brattain's examination of isomers proved doubly important to the war effort. In addition to the C4 hydrocarbon isomers isobutane and n-butane (important in aviation fuels) Brattain was able to identify a set of four butenes, 1-butene, cis-2-butene, trans-2-butene, and isobutene. The butylene isomers were critical for the development of synthetic rubber, another essential material for the war effort. Compared to previous distillation methods, infrared spectrophotometry offered a tremendous time savings, reducing testing time from as much as 15 or 20 hours down to 15 minutes.

During World War II, North America was faced with a shortage of natural rubber, because the war cut off supplies from rubber-growing countries. The Office of Rubber Reserve of the United States government recognized a need to develop synthetic rubber. Brattain's former professor R. Bowling Barnes, now at Cyanamid, promoted the use of infrared spectrophotometers in the US synthetic rubber program. In 1942 the Office of Rubber Reserve arranged secret meetings in Detroit between Robert Brattain of the Shell Development Company, Arnold O. Beckman of Beckman Instruments, and R. Bowling Barnes of American Cyanamid, seeking a source of reliable instruments for infrared spectroscopy and the analysis of butadiene polymers. Choosing to adopt Bob Brattain's existing design for a single-beam infrared spectrophotometer, they commissioned Beckman Instruments to mass-produce standardized instruments for scientists to use as part of the U.S. government's synthetic-rubber war effort.

Production of the instruments was given a AAA priority rating, which ensured that they had access to limited war-time resources. However, the instruments could only be sold to AAA-certified customers, and the research, the instrument design, and the instruments were kept classified until after the war. No one was allowed to publish or discuss anything related to the new machines. With orders from both government and industry, National Technical Laboratories produced and shipped 77 Beckman IR-1s by 1945. They were a critical contribution to the war effort. This government-supported collaboration led to quick development and rapid transmission of the technology within a network of war-time companies, but the secrecy restrictions limited the extent to which the Brattain-Beckman work became publicly known. Companies such as Perkin-Elmer whose work was not as restricted, were able to publish about their work in infrared spectroscopy before Brattain and Beckman could do so. After the war, such instruments were adopted widely by chemists because they were simple to use, reliable, and reasonably priced.

=== Penicillin ===
Penicillin, a powerful antibiotic, was discovered in 1928 by Scottish scientist Sir Alexander Fleming. During World War II, the drug was in demand to treat both wounds and life-threatening illnesses such as meningitis, pneumonia and syphilis. Production of penicillin increased from 400 million units in early 1943 to more than 650 billion units per month by the end of the war. There was tremendous pressure to find ways to increase production. Researchers hoped that by understanding the chemical structure of penicillin they could find a way to synthesize it. Several possible structures were hypothesized, including an oxazalone structure with 2 linked 5-member rings, and a β-lactam structure involving a 4-member ring, something that had not been observed naturally.

A transatlantic research project was developed to determine the structure of penicillin. It included infrared spectroscopy researchers at Cambridge (G.B.B.M. Sutherland), at Oxford (Harold Warris Thompson), and universities and companies in the United States (the Department of Physics at the University of Michigan, Shell Development Company, Merck & Co., Pfizer, and the Russell Sage Institute of Cornell University Medical College). The US Office of Scientific Research and Development approached Shell during the summer of 1944, and Robert Brattain assembled a team to study the problem using infrared spectrophotometry. Another team at Shell used chemical synthesis techniques. By November 1944 both teams agreed that penicillin had a β-lactam structure. Only that structure explained the presence of strong bands at frequencies of 1785, 1740, 1667 and 1538 cm-1 on the spectroscopy results. Brattain and his co-workers released a report to the government describing their results in 1944. A full report of the international infrared spectroscopy work appeared in 1949.

Working independently in Britain, Dorothy Crowfoot and Barbara Low in Oxford, England used x-ray diffraction to study penicillin's structure, as did researchers at Imperial Chemical Industries. At much the same time as Brattain's group, Dorothy Crowfoot's x-ray crystallography group found results supporting the conclusion that penicillin had a β-lactam structure. Her research was reported in early 1945. For this and other research using x-ray diffraction Dorothy Crowfoot would eventually earn a Nobel Prize.

=== Nerve gas ===
After the war, Brattain was asked to carry out hazardous research studying the structure of German nerve gases that had been used in World War II.

After retirement, Robert Brattain lived in Monterey, California.
