= George W. Downs (physicist) =

George W. Downs (1911 – November 8, 1964) was an American physicist and corporate officer.

Downs was born in 1911 in Mt. Vernon, South Dakota, and studied at the California Institute of Technology. In 1935, he was named chief engineer of the Lansing Manufacturing Company. In 1939, joined the William Miller Corporation, a scientific instruments developer in Pasadena, California.

During World War II, Downs served for a time as a physicist in the University of California's War Research Division, before returning to Caltech in 1943 as a development engineer on rocketry and torpedo projects.

In 1946, he helped organize the Applied Physics Corporation with Howard Cary, namesake of Cary Scientific Instruments. In 1963, Downs retired as the company's vice president, but continuing as a director until his death. later known as Cary Instruments, a division of Varian Medical Systems. In 1948, he was named president of Research Instrument Corporation.

Downs was a fellow of the Acoustical Society of America, and a member of the Optical Society of American and the American Physical Society.

Downs died November 8, 1964, in Pasadena, California. The Downs-Lauritsen Laboratory of Physics, on the campus of the California Institute of Technology, is named after him.
