= Particle size analysis =

Laboratory technique

Particle size analysis, particle size measurement, or simply particle sizing, is the collective name of the technical procedures, or laboratory techniques which determines the size range, and/or the average, or mean size of the particles in a powder or liquid sample.

Particle size analysis is part of particle science, and it is generally carried out in particle technology laboratories.

The particle size measurement is typically achieved by means of devices, called Particle Size Analyzers (PSA), which are based on different technologies, such as high definition image processing, analysis of Brownian motion, gravitational settling of the particle and light scattering (Rayleigh and Mie scattering) of the particles.

The particle size can have considerable importance in a number of industries including the chemical, food, mining, forestry, agriculture, cosmetics, pharmaceutical, energy, and aggregate industries.

== Particle size analysis based on light scattering ==
Particle size analysis based on light scattering has widespread application in many fields, as it allows relatively easy optical characterization of samples enabling improved quality control of products in many industries including pharmaceutical, food, cosmetic, and polymer production. Recent years have seen many advancements in light scattering technologies for particle characterization.

For particles in the lower nanometer to lower micrometer range, dynamic light scattering (DLS) has now become an industry standard technique. It is also by far the most widely used light scattering technique for particle characterization in the academic world. This method analyzes the fluctuations of scattered light by particles in suspension when illuminated with a laser to determine the velocity of the Brownian motion, which can then be used to obtain the hydrodynamic size of particles using the Stokes-Einstein relationship. DLS is a fast and non-invasive technique, which is also precise and highly repeatable. Furthermore, since the technique is based on the measurement of light scattering as a function of time, the technique is considered absolute and the DLS instruments do not require calibration. Amongst its disadvantages is the fact that it does not properly resolve highly polydisperse samples, while the presence of large particles can affect size accuracy. Other scattering techniques have emerged, such as nanoparticle tracking analysis (NTA), which tracks individual particle movement through scattering using image recording. NTA also measures the hydrodynamic size of particles from the diffusion coefficient but is capable of overcoming some of the limitations posed by DLS. The next generation of NTA technology is called interferometric nanoparticle tracking analysis (iNTA) and is based on the interferometric scattering microscopy (iSCAT). In contrast to NTA, iNTA has a superior size resolution and gives access to the effective refractive index of the particles.

While the above-mentioned techniques are best suited for measuring particles typically in the submicron region, particle size analyzers (PSAs) based on static light scattering or laser diffraction (LD) have become the most popular and widely used instruments for measuring particles from hundreds of nanometers to several millimeters. Similar scattering theory is also utilized in systems based on non-electromagnetic wave propagation, such as ultrasonic analyzers. In LD PSAs, a laser beam is used to irradiate a dilute suspension of particles. The light scattered by the particles in the forward direction is focused by a lens onto a large array of concentric photodetector rings. The smaller the particle is, the larger the scattering angle of the laser beam is. Thus, by measuring the angle-dependent scattered intensity, one can infer the particle size distribution using Fraunhofer or Mie scattering models. In the latter case, prior knowledge of the refractive index of the particle being measured as well as the dispersant is required.

Commercial LD PSAs have gained popularity due to their broad dynamic range, rapid measurement, high reproducibility and the capability to perform online measurements. However, these devices are generally large in size (~700 × 300 × 450 mm), heavy (~30 kg) and expensive (in the 50–200 K€ range). On the one hand, the large size of common devices is due to the large distance needed between the sample and the detectors to provide the desired angular resolution. Furthermore, their high price is mainly due to the use of expensive laser sources and a large number of detectors, i.e., one sensor for each scattering angle to be monitored. Some commercial devices contain up to twenty sensors. This complexity of commercial LD PSAs, together with the fact that they often require maintenance and highly trained personnel, make them impractical in the majority of online industrial applications, which require the installation of probes in processing environments, often at multiple locations. An alternative method for PSD is cuvette-based SPR technique, that simultaneously measures the particle size ranging 10 nm-10 μm and concentration in a standard spectrophotometer. The optical filter inserted in the cuvette consists of nano-photonic crystals with very high angular resolution, which enables the analysis of PSD by automatically quantifying Mie scattering and Rayleigh scattering.

The application of LD PSAs is also normally restricted to dilute suspensions. This is because the optical models used to estimate the particle size distribution (PSD) are based on a single scattering approximation. In practice, most industrial processes require measuring concentrated suspensions, where multiple scattering becomes a prominent effect. Multiple scattering in dense media leads to an underestimation of the particle size since the light scattered by the particles encounters diffraction points multiple times before reaching the detector, which in turn increases the apparent scattering angle. To overcome this issue, LD PSAs require appropriate sampling and dilution systems, which increase capital investments and operational costs. Another approach is to apply multiple scattering correction models together with the optical models to compute the PSD. A large number of algorithms for multiple scattering correction can be found in the literature. However, these algorithms typically require implementing a complex correction, which increases the computation time and is often not suitable for online measurements. An alternative approach to compute the PSD without the use of optical models and complex correction factors is to apply machine learning (ML) techniques.

=== Microfluidic diffusional sizing ===
Microfluidic diffusional sizing (MDS) is a method of particle size analysis dependent on the diffusion of particles within a laminar flow. The method has found applications in proteomics and related fields where nano-sized particles may vary in size depending on their environment.

== Paints and Coatings ==
Typically, paints and coatings are subjected to multiple rounds of particle size analysis, as the particle size of the individual components influences parameters as diverse as hint strength, hiding power, gloss, viscosity, stability and weather resistance.

== Mining and Building Materials ==
The size of materials being processed in an operation is very important. Having oversize material being conveyed will cause damage to equipment and slow down production. Particle-size analysis also helps the effectiveness of SAG Mills when crushing material.

In the building industry, the particle size can directly affect the strength of the final material, as it observed for cement. Two of the most used techniques used for the particle size characterization of minerals are sieving and laser diffraction. These techniques are faster and cheaper compared to image-based techniques.

== Food and Beverages Industry ==
The optimization of the particle size distribution facilitates the pumping, mixing and transportation of foodstuff. Particle size analysis is usually done with any milled food, such as coffee, flour, cocoa powder. It is especially helpful with chocolate quality to ensure there is a consistent taste and feeling when eaten. Furthermore, in the case of food emulsions, particle size analysis is relevant to predict stability and shelf-life, and optimize homogenization.

== Agriculture ==
The gradation of soils, or soil texture, affects water and nutrient holding and drainage capabilities. For sand-based soils, particle size can be the dominant characteristic affecting soil performances and hence crop. Sieving has long been the technique of choice for soil texture analysis, although laser diffraction instruments are increasingly used as they considerably speed up the analytical process, and provide highly reproducible results.

Particle size analysis in the agriculture industry is paramount because unwanted materials will contaminate products if they are not detected. By having an automated particle size analyzer, companies can closely monitor their processes.

== Forestry ==
Wood particles used to make various types of products rely on particle-size analysis to maintain high quality standards. By doing so, companies reduce waste and become more productive.

== Aggregates ==
Having properly sized particles allow aggregate companies to create long-lasting roads and other products. Particle size analysis is also routinely conducted on bitumen emulsions to predict their stability and their behavior.

== Biology ==
Particle size analyzers are used also in biology to measure protein aggregation.

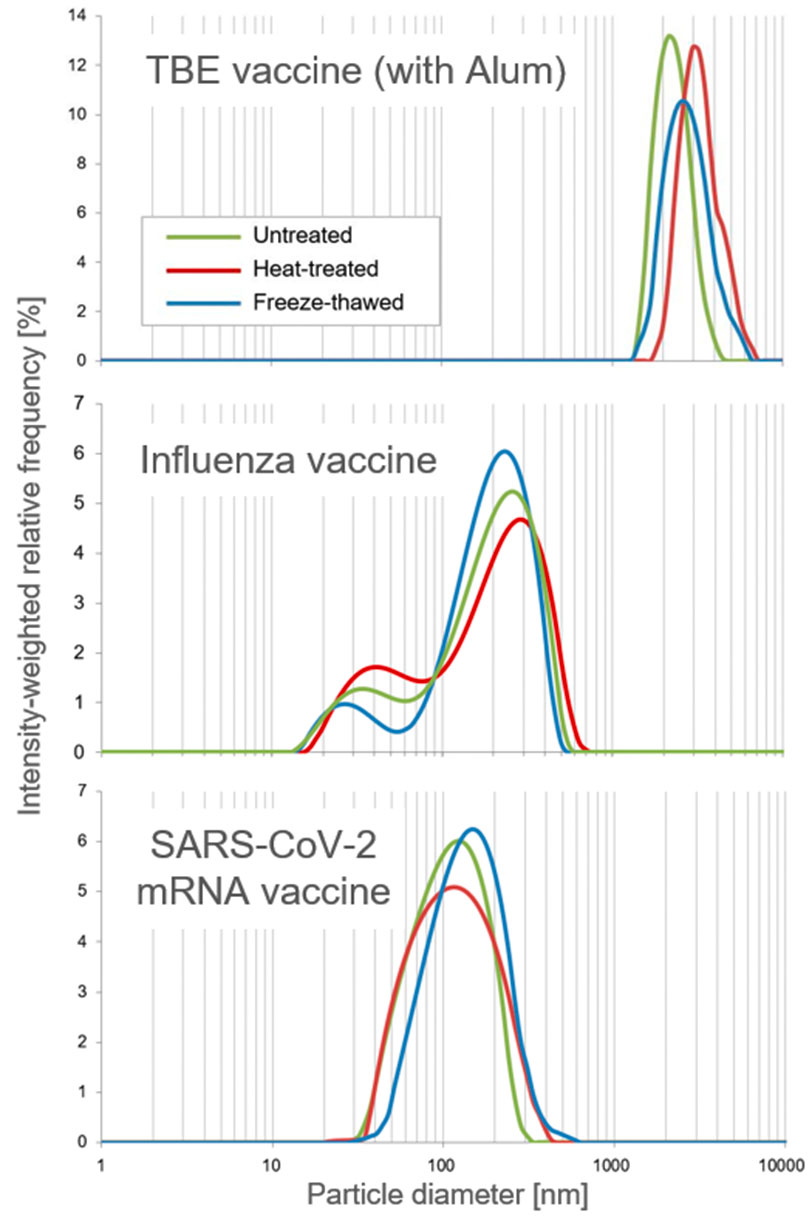
Particle size distribution of antiviral vaccines subjected to cold-chain disruptions, analyzed by Dynamic Light Scattering (DLS)

DLS is a particularly appreciated technique for the characterization of nanoparticles designed for drug delivery, such as vaccines. DLS instruments are for instance part of the quality control process for mRNA vaccines formulated in lipid nanoparticle carriers.

== Selecting the most appropriate technique for size analysis ==
There is a large number of methods for the determination of particle size, and it is important to acknowledge that these different methods are not expected to give identical results. The size of a particle depends on the method used for its measurement, and it is important to choose the method that is most relevant to the application.

The "See also" section covers many of these techniques. In most of them, the particle size is inferred from a measurement of, for example: light scattering; electrical resistance; particle motion, rather than a direct measurement of particle diameter. This enables rapid measurement of a particle size distribution by an instrument, but does require some form of calibration or assumptions regarding the nature of the particles. Most often this includes the assumption of spherical particles, thus giving a result which is an equivalent spherical diameter. Thus, it is usual for measured particle size distributions to be different when comparing the results between different equipment. The most appropriate method to use is normally the one where the method is aligned to the end use of the data.

For example, to choose whether a chemical compound should be measured by dynamic light scattering or laser diffraction, one generally considers the expected size range, the sample type (liquid or solid), the amount of sample available, the chemical stability, as well its application field. If designing a sedimentation vessel, then a sedimentation technique for sizing is most relevant. However, this approach is often not possible, and an alternative technique must be used. An online Expert system to assist in the selection (and elimination) of particle size analysis equipment has been developed.

== See also ==
- Sieving
- Sieve analysis
- Laser diffraction analysis
- Sedimentation
- Elutriation
- Microscope counting
- Coulter counter
- Dynamic light scattering
- Imaging Particle Analysis
- Aerosol mass spectrometry
- Obscuration SPOS
