= Laser diffraction analysis =

Technology for measuring geometrical dimensions of particle

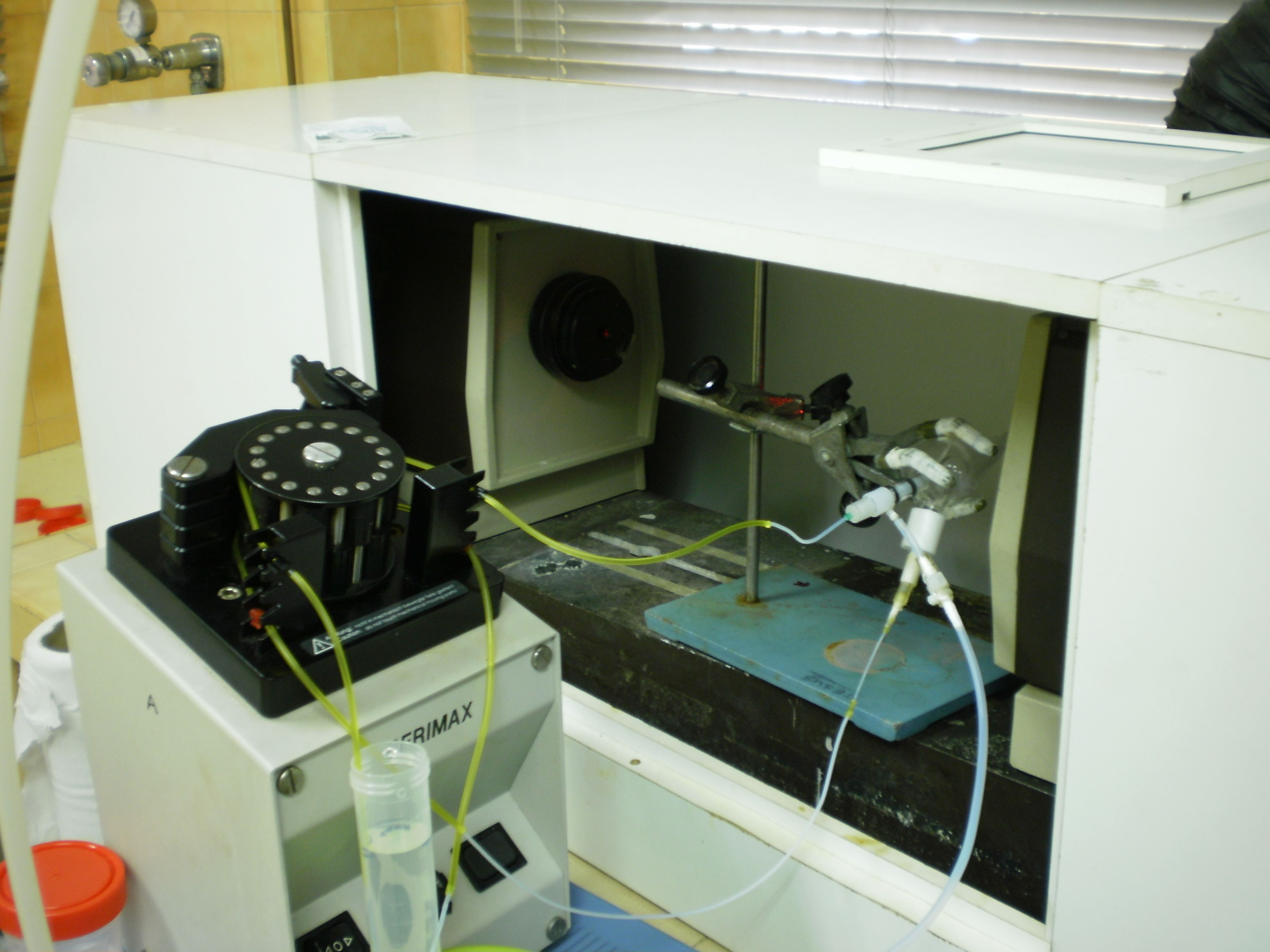
Laser diffraction analyzer

Laser diffraction analysis, also known as laser diffraction spectroscopy, is a technology that utilizes diffraction patterns of a laser beam passed through any object ranging from nanometers to millimeters in size to quickly measure geometrical dimensions of a particle. This particle size analysis process does not depend on volumetric flow rate, the amount of particles that passes through a surface over time.

== Fraunhofer vs. Mie Theory ==
Particles moving through the spread parallel laser beam

Laser diffraction analysis is originally based on the Fraunhofer diffraction theory, stating that the intensity of light scattered by a particle is directly proportional to the particle size. The angle of the laser beam and particle size have an inversely proportional relationship, where the laser beam angle increases as particle size decreases and vice versa. The Mie scattering model, or Mie theory, is used as alternative to the Fraunhofer theory since the 1990s.

Commercial laser diffraction analyzers leave to the user the choice of using either Fraunhofer or Mie theory for data analysis, hence the importance of understanding the strengths and limitations of both models. Fraunhofer theory only takes into account the diffraction phenomena occurring at the contour of the particle. Its main advantage is that it does not require any knowledge of the optical properties (complex refractive index) of the particle’s material. Hence is it typically applied to samples of unknown optical properties, or to mixtures of different materials. For samples of known optical properties, Fraunhofer theory should only be applied for particles of an expected diameter at least 10 times larger than the light source’s wavelength, and/or to opaque particles.

The Mie theory is based on measuring the scattering of electromagnetic waves on spherical particles. Hence, it is taking into account not only the diffraction at the particle’s contour, but also the refraction, reflection and absorption phenomena within the particle and at its surface. Thus, this theory is better suited than the Fraunhofer theory for particles that are not significantly larger than the wavelength of the light source, and to transparent particles. The model’s main limitation is that it requires precise knowledge of the complex refractive index (including the absorption coefficient) of the particle’s material. The lower theoretical detection limit of laser diffraction, using the Mie theory, is generally thought to lie around 10 nm.

== Optical setup ==
Laser diffraction analysis is typically accomplished via a red He-Ne laser or laser diode, a high-voltage power supply, and structural packaging. Alternatively, blue laser diodes or LEDs of shorter wavelength may be used. The light source affects the detection limits, with lasers of shorter wavelengths better suited for the detection of submicron particles. Angling of the light energy produced by the laser is detected by having a beam of light go through a flow of dispersed particles and then onto a sensor. A lens is placed between the object being analyzed and the detector's focal point, causing only the surrounding laser diffraction to appear. The sizes the laser can analyze depend on the lens' focal length, the distance from the lens to its point of focus. As the focal length increases, the area the laser can detect increases as well, displaying a proportional relationship.

Multiple light detectors are used to collect the diffracted light, which are placed at fixed angles relative to the laser beam. More detector elements extend sensitivity and size limits. A computer can then be used to detect the object's particle sizes from the light energy produced and its layout, which the computer derives from the data collected on the particle frequencies and wavelengths.

In practical terms, laser diffraction instruments can measure particles in liquid suspension, using a carrier solvent, or as dry powders, using compressed air or simply gravity to mobilize the particles. Sprays and aerosols generally require a specific setup.

== Results ==
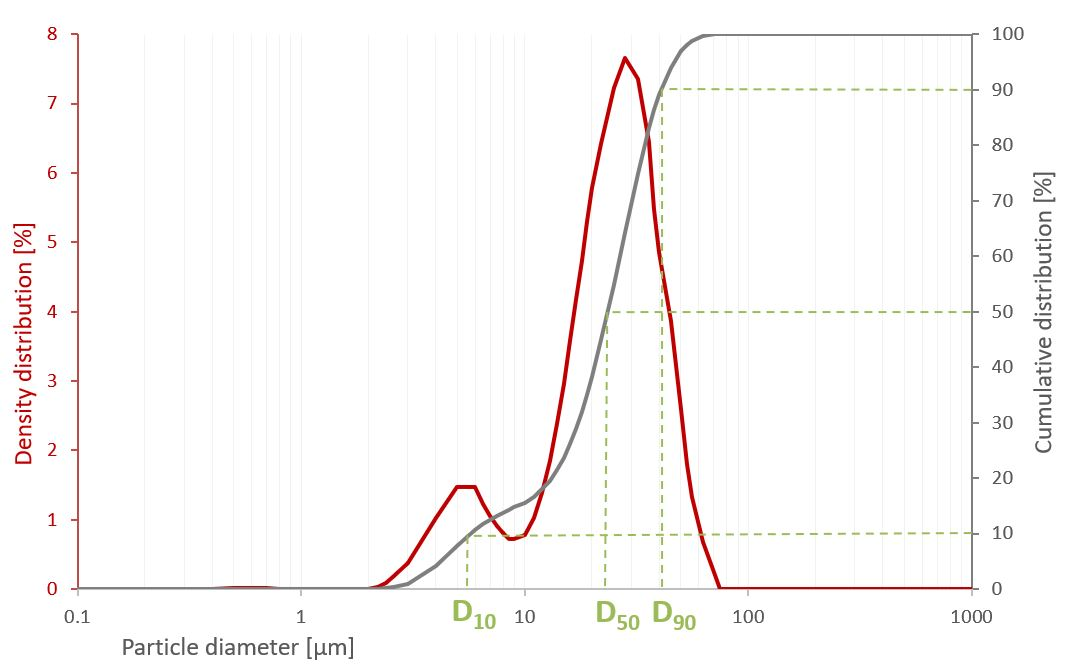
Particle size distribution (density and cumulative undersize) obtained by laser diffraction

=== Volume-weighted particle size distribution ===
Because the light energy recorded by the detector array is proportional to the volume of the particles, laser diffraction results are intrinsically volume-weighted. This means that the particle size distribution represents the volume of particle material in the different size classes. This is in contrast to counting-based optical methods such as microscopy or dynamic image analysis, which report the number of particles in the different size classes. That the diffracted light is proportional to the particle’s volume also implies that results are assuming particle sphericity, i.e. that the particle size result is an equivalent spherical diameter. Hence particle shape cannot be determined by the technique.

The main graphical representation of laser diffraction results is the volume-weighted particle size distribution, either represented as density distribution (which highlights the different modes) or as cumulative undersize distribution.

=== Numerical results ===
The most widely used numerical laser diffraction results are:

- The median volume-weighted diameter, or D_{50}. Derived from the cumulative curve, it represents the particle diameter separating the upper 50% of the data from the lower 50%.
- The D_{10} and D_{90} values, also derived from the cumulative curve.
- The mean volume-weighted diameter, also termed D[4,3] or De Brouckere mean diameter.
- The span, which gives a measure of the width of the particle size distribution, and is calculated as span = [D_{90} – D_{10}]/D_{50}.

=== Result quality and instrument validation ===
Harmonized standards for the accuracy and precision of laser diffraction measurements have been defined both by ISO, in standard ISO 13320:2020, and by the United States Pharmacopoeia, in chapter USP <429>.

== Uses ==
Laser diffraction analysis has been used to measure particle-size objects in situations such as:

- observing distribution of soil texture and sediments such as clay and mud, with an emphasis on silt and the sizes of bigger samples of clay.
- determining in situ measurements of particles in estuaries. Particles in estuaries are important as they allow for natural or pollutant chemical species to move around with ease. The size, density, and stability of particles in estuaries are important for their transportation. Laser diffraction analysis is used here to compare particle size distributions to support this claim as well as find cycles of change in estuaries that occur because of different particles.
- soil and its stability when wet. The stability of soil aggregation (clumps held together by moist clay) and clay dispersion (clay separating in moist soil), the two different states of soil in the Cerrado savanna region, were compared with laser diffraction analysis to determine if plowing had an effect on the two. Measurements were made before plowing and after plowing for different intervals of time. Clay dispersion turned out to not be affected by plowing while soil aggregation did.
- erythrocyte deformability under shear. Due to a special phenomenon called tank treading, the membrane of the erythrocyte (red blood cell, RBC) rotates relative to the shear force and the cell's cytoplasm causing RBCs to orient themselves. Oriented and stretched red blood cells have a diffraction pattern representing the apparent particle size in each direction, making it possible to measure the erythrocyte deformability and the orientability of the cells. In an ektacytometer erythrocyte deformability can be measured under changing osmotic stress or oxygen tension and is used in the diagnosis and follow up of congenital hemolytic anemias.

== Comparisons ==
Since laser diffraction analysis is not the sole way of measuring particles it has been compared to the sieve-pipette method, which is a traditional technique for grain size analysis. When compared, results showed that laser diffraction analysis made fast calculations that were easy to recreate after a one-time analysis, did not need large sample sizes, and produced large amounts of data. Results can easily be manipulated because the data is on a digital surface. Both the sieve-pipette method and laser diffraction analysis are able to analyze minuscule objects, but laser diffraction analysis resulted in having better precision than its counterpart method of particle measurement.

== Criticism ==
Laser diffraction analysis has been questioned in validity in the following areas:

- assumptions including particles having random configurations and volume values. In some dispersion units, particles have been shown to align themselves together rather than have a turbulent flow, causing them to lead themselves in an orderly direction.
- algorithms used in laser diffraction analysis are not thoroughly validated. Different algorithms are used at times to have collected data match assumptions made by users as an attempt to avoid data that looks incorrect.
- measurement inaccuracies due to sharp edges on objects. Laser diffraction analysis has the chance of detecting imaginary particles at sharp edges because of the large angles the lasers make upon them.
- when compared to the data collecting of optical imaging, another particle-sizing technique, correlation between the two was poor for non-spherical particles. This is due to the fact that the underlying Fraunhofer and Mie theories only cover spherical particles. Non-spherical particles cause more diffuse scatter patterns and are more difficult to interpret. Some manufacturers have included algorithms in their software which can partly compensate for non-spherical particles.

== See also ==
- Diffraction tomography
- List of laser articles
- Particle size distribution
