= Cheluviation =

Soil process

Cheluviation is the process in which the metal ions in the upper layer of the soil are combined with organic ligands to form coordination complexes or chelates, moving downwards through eluviation and then depositing.

Metal ions that can participate in chelation include Fe, Al, Mn, Ca, Mg and trace elements in soil, while the organic ligands combined with these metal ions come mainly from the soil organic matter. Soil organic matter includes relatively stable complex organic compounds (such as lignin, protein, humus, etc.), as well as some simple organic acids and intermediate products of microbial decomposition of organic matter. These organic coordination compounds all contain active groups to varying degrees. Chain organic coordination compounds are complexed with metal ions to generate complexes, and these generated complexes containing multiple coordination atoms in a cyclic structure with metal ions are called chelates. The stability of the chelate is related to the number of atoms in the chelate ring, the stability constant of the chelation reaction, and the concentration of organic chelating agents and metal ions. The chelates produced by fulvic acid and metal ions in soil humus have strong leaching and deposition effects, and therefore are an important manifestation of soil cheluviation, which is generally resulting in the formation of gray-white leaching layers and dark brown/red deposited layer.

== Dissolution and chelation of metal elements ==
Organic acids have the ability to dissolve soil minerals, and can destroy silicate minerals and iron and aluminum oxides, so that metal ions are precipitated and complexed with organic complexing agents through ion exchange, surface absorption, and chelation-reaction mechanisms. For example, at low pH, a large number of metal ions are complexed with organic acids. When the organic acid occupies the coordination position of the metal ion, it can prevent the precipitation and crystallization of the metal oxide and increase its solubility. Conversely, at high pH (e.g. 7–8), dissolved metal ions, such as Fe(III), will precipitate out of the solution as insoluble complexes.

== Eluviation of chelate compounds ==
The eluviation of chelate compounds is the downward movement of soil chelates. The eluviation of chelate compounds can be affected by:

- Acidity. Organic acids produced under acidic conditions can increase the solubility of metal elements such as iron and aluminum, thereby enhancing soil eluviation. Iron and aluminum are easily leached at low pH. As the pH increases, ferric hydroxide and aluminum hydroxide compounds precipitate.
- Redox conditions. Under reducing conditions, more organic acids are produced and metal ions are reduced to soluble metal complexes that migrate into the soil. Under oxidative conditions, metal ions are easily precipitated, and the chelate is easily polymerized, thereby separating the chelate from the metal ions.
- Soil texture. Clay has a certain adsorption capacity for chelates, which weakens the leaching of complexes. On the other hand, soils with a coarse texture and water-saturated soils will likely enhance the leaching effect of chelates.
