= Differential dynamic microscopy =

Bright-field microscope as used in differential dynamic microscopy. Inset: the light scattered by a particle interferes with the transmitted light; q = k_{s} − k_{i} is the scattering vector.

Differential dynamic microscopy (DDM) is an imaging-based optical technique that enables performing light scattering-like experiments by means of a conventional optical microscope. It uses time sequences of microscope images to extract dynamic information about microscopic fluctuations over a range of length scales and time delays, analogous to what is obtained in dynamic light scattering (DLS) experiments. The DDM approach was first introduced in 2008 by Roberto Cerbino and Véronique Trappe, who first demonstrated it in combination with bright-field microscopy. DDM is suitable for typical soft materials such as liquids, gels, suspensions of colloids and polymers, liquid crystals and it has been applied to various biological systems including bacteria and cells.

== History and developments ==
The DDM technique was introduced in 2008 by Cerbino & Trappe as a way to probe wavevector-resolved dynamics of colloidal particles using a microscope equipped with a high-speed camera, demonstrating that dynamic information similar to that obtained in DLS can be extracted from time-lapse images taken in real space. Shortly thereafter, Giavazzi et al. discussed extensions to other imaging modalities, also based on fluorescence, and clarified the connections of DDM to related imaging-based scattering methods (see below the section Relationship with other imaging-based scattering methods).

DDM was later used to characterize bacterial motility and dynamics of microorganisms, in which context it was also extended to confocal fluorescence microscopy.

In parallel with the increasing adoption by several group worldwide, several review and perspective articles on DDM have been published.

== DDM in a nutshell ==
DDM analysis of a bright-field movie: (a) frames a lag time Δt apart are subtracted, and the time-averaged squared modulus of the Fourier transform of the difference gives the image structure function D(q_{x}, q_{y}, Δt), which is averaged over rings of constant q; (b) D(q, Δt) at three wave vectors with fits to A(q)[1 − f(q, Δt)] + B(q); (c) the fitted relaxation rate Γ(q) follows Γ = D_{0}q^{2}, as expected for Brownian motion. Images and data are simulated (Brownian particles imaged in bright field).

To use DDM, one starts from a microscope movie, i.e. a time sequence of images $I(\mathbf{x},t)$ acquired at a fixed plane in the sample. The key assumption is that the recorded intensity fluctuations are related to fluctuations of a physical field of interest (often the number density of particles, or fluorescence-labeled structures), possibly blurred by the microscope point spread function (PSF).

This proportionality between image intensity and the quantity of interest holds in two main classes of experiments:

- Scattering-based DDM, where the image arises from the interference between a strong transmitted beam and weakly scattered light, as in bright-field, phase-contrast or polarized imaging;
- Fluorescence-based DDM, where the image is the incoherent sum of the light emitted by labelled particles or structures, as in wide-field fluorescence or confocal imaging.

In both classes, blurring by the microscope corresponds to a convolution operation in real space and to a simple product in Fourier space. This implies that each Fourier mode of the image can be analysed separately.

Independent of the imaging mode, the steps of the DDM analysis are the same; what changes is the transfer function of the microscope, and with it the amplitude of the signal at each wavevector.

To separate spatial scales, each image is analysed in Fourier space: fluctuations are decomposed into modes labelled by a wavevector $\mathbf{q}$, corresponding to a characteristic length scale $\sim 2\pi/q$. Dynamics is then quantified by comparing images separated by a time delay $\Delta t$. In the most common implementation, one computes the Fourier power spectrum of the difference between two images separated by $\Delta t$, and averages this quantity over many pairs to improve statistics. This yields the image structure function $D(q,\Delta t)$ (also called DDM matrix), which increases from a noise/background level at short delays to a plateau at long delays as the fluctuations decorrelate.

Under typical conditions, the image structure function $D(q,\Delta t)$ can connected to the normalized intermediate scattering function $f(q,\Delta t)$, i.e. the same dynamical correlation function that DLS is based upon. Consequently, by fitting the $\Delta t$-dependence at each $q$ with appropriate models (diffusion, advection/ballistic motion, mixtures of processes), DDM yields quantitative parameters such as diffusion coefficients, characteristic speeds, or relaxation times.

== Comparison with other methods and limitations ==
DDM complements dynamic light scattering (DLS) by using, similarly to multiple particle tracking (MPT), microscope images. However, unlike particle tracking, it does not locate or follow individual particles. It requires fewer user-set parameters, and analysis time depends on image size rather than particle count. DDM has been used to study particles below the optical resolution limit and suspensions too concentrated for individual particles to be tracked. It yields average dynamics for the analysed region rather than individual trajectories.

DDM typically probes wavevectors of about 0.1–10 μm^{−1}, compared with roughly 17 μm^{−1} for DLS at a scattering angle of 90 degrees. Fluctuations at smaller wavevectors are slower, allowing fast-diffusing particles to be studied with standard scientific cameras. Separate regions of an image can be analysed to measure spatial variations in sample dynamics. A typical measurement probes tens of nanolitres, so microlitre quantities of sample are sufficient.

DDM can use the white-light illumination of a standard microscope, whereas DLS requires a coherent light source. It has been applied to bright-field, phase-contrast, fluorescence, confocal, light-sheet, polarized and dark-field imaging. Image subtraction removes static signals, such as those from dust on optical surfaces, which can strongly affect DLS measurements. DDM is less affected by multiple scattering than conventional DLS and has been used in turbid suspensions. Confocal DDM has also been applied to dense and opaque samples.

The range of measurable dynamics depends on the microscope and recording settings. The field of view sets the smallest accessible wavevector, while pixel size and the objective's numerical aperture limit the largest. The frame rate and recording duration determine the fastest and slowest dynamics that can be measured. In thick samples, the signal is averaged along the optical axis over the depth of field, affecting measurements particularly at small wavevectors. Camera noise and the number of images limit sensitivity. In a comparison involving proteins, the lowest concentration measurable by DDM was about ten times higher than that measurable by commercial DLS instruments.

DDM commonly uses recordings of hundreds to thousands of frames, acquired over tens to hundreds of seconds. Shorter recordings give noisier results, making rapidly changing dynamics harder to characterize. Processing these recordings is computationally intensive. Optimized parallel implementations such as fastDDM have reduced analysis times for typical datasets by up to four orders of magnitude. DLS is available in ready-to-use commercial instruments; DDM uses camera-equipped microscopes but has largely depended on analysis software developed by individual research groups.

== Data analysis ==
DDM analysis is based on the differential dynamic algorithm (DDA), developed in the context of optical fluctuation studies. In this approach, pairs of images separated by a delay $\Delta t$ are subtracted to suppress static backgrounds and highlight changes due to motion. A two-dimensional fast Fourier transform (FFT) of the difference images yields a Fourier-space representation of the dynamics across spatial frequencies. Averaging the resulting power spectra over many image pairs with the same $\Delta t$ (and, for isotropic samples, over wavevector directions) gives the image structure function $D(q,\Delta t)$. Theoretical analysis shows that in general one has

$D(q,\Delta t)=A(q)[1-f(q,\Delta t)]+B(q),$	1

where $f(q,\Delta t)$ is the normalized intermediate scattering function, $B(q)$ is a background term associated with detection noise, and the amplitude $A(q)$ is the product of a function describing correlations within the sample and a transfer function that describe the microscope and imaging mode.

For simple Brownian motion, one has $f(q,\Delta t)=\exp[-\Gamma(q)\Delta t]$, where $\Gamma(q)=D_0 q^{2}$ is the relaxation rate and $D_0$ is the diffusion coefficient of hte Brownian particles. More complicated models can be used for different types of samples and motion. For instance, models including directed (ballistic) motion, mixtures of populations, or distributions of speeds are used for active systems such as swimming bacteria.

A variant called multi-DDM analyses sub-regions of the image frame, analogous to varying the scattering volume in traditional light scattering. This variant can reveal spatial variations in dynamics and is particularly valuable for studying heterogeneous systems such as biological networks and phase-separating materials where local dynamics vary significantly with position.

== Variants and extensions ==
=== Imaging modes ===
DDM has been applied to bright-field, phase-contrast, fluorescence, confocal, polarized and dark-field imaging. Dark-field imaging improves the signal from strongly scattering nanoparticles such as gold colloids. Beyond optical microscopy, X-ray differential dynamic radiography uses sequences of X-ray radiographs to measure particle dynamics within porous materials that are opaque to visible light.

=== Samples under flow and shear ===
Extensions of DDM distinguish motion imposed by flow or shear from other particle dynamics. Aime and Cipelletti developed a framework for separating these contributions in DDM measurements. Under oscillatory shear, echo-DDM isolates irreversible rearrangements by comparing images separated by one or more full periods, cancelling the reversible deformation. For steady flow, flow-DDM analyses wavevectors perpendicular to the flow direction. DDM combined with image velocimetry has also been used to measure diffusion coefficients across the laminar flow profile of a microfluidic channel.

=== Time resolution ===
Pulsed illumination has extended DDM beyond the time resolution set by the camera frame rate in standard measurements. A single-camera system with a pulsed LED achieved a time resolution of 80 microseconds, using short light pulses with delays arranged in a geometric progression.

=== Noise, uncertainty and machine learning ===
Statistical approaches to DDM estimate dynamical parameters and their uncertainties. A convolutional neural network trained to reduce noise in the intermediate scattering function enabled decay times to be estimated from recordings of only tens of frames. This approach supports measurements of dynamics that change over time or vary across a sample.

== Software and tutorials ==
Open-source software for DDM analysis includes PyDDM, described in a protocol paper on cytoskeleton dynamics, and fastDDM, released with the 2025 tutorial article The Hitchhiker's guide to differential dynamic microscopy. The article covers experiments and analysis, with open datasets for teaching and reproducibility.

The Python package fastDDM has documentation and source code hosted on GitHub. Its optimized parallel algorithms have reduced analysis times for typical datasets by up to four orders of magnitude. A companion repository contains worked examples and tutorial notebooks, and the tutorial datasets are archived in PHAIDRA with a DOI.

== Applications ==
=== Colloids and complex fluids ===
In early applications DDM was used to measure Brownian motion in dilute and concentrated suspensions of colloidal particles. Diffusion coefficients were obtained from the wavevector dependence of decorrelation rates. Later studies focused on the dynamics of anisotropic colloids.

DDM measurements of diffusion have also been used to do particle sizing through the Stokes–Einstein equation, including in mixtures with multimodal size distributions whose individual particles could not be resolved. A study of proteins at concentrations of a few milligrams per milliliter reported hydrodynamic radii in agreement with commercial DLS measurements, using microliter sample volumes.

Studies of turbid suspensions have covered different concentrations and optical thicknesses, including samples difficult to measure by conventional light scattering. Confocal and fluorescence implementations have been applied to fluorescent samples and concentrated, multiply scattering systems. In dairy research, DDM has been used to study casein micelle dynamics and rennet-induced aggregation, as well as early acid-induced gelation in undiluted skim milk. Combined with cryo-FIB-SEM tomography, it has also been used to size fat globules and casein micelles in homogenized milk without prior separation.

=== Soft materials and rheology ===
In microrheology and viscometry, DDM measurements of tracer fluctuations have yielded viscosities and frequency-dependent viscoelastic moduli from small sample volumes, without tracking individual particles.

DDM studies of liquid crystals have probed orientational molecular relaxation, anisotropic dynamics and fluctuations near phase transitions. Work on confined nematic cells has characterized director fluctuations and changes in dynamic correlations near phase boundaries. Measurements by DDM and single-particle tracking have also been compared in suspensions of rod-like fd viruses across the isotropic, nematic and smectic phases.

Studies of out-of-equilibrium soft materials include measurements of dynamics across several length scales and relaxation regimes in colloidal gels, heterogeneous dynamics in two-dimensional glassy colloids and Brownian yet non-Gaussian diffusion of tracer particles in hard-sphere glasses. At charged interfaces, fluorescence DDM combined with confocal imaging has measured the slowing of network fluctuations in hyaluronic acid gels.

=== Biological systems ===
Studies of bacterial motility have used DDM to measure population swimming speeds, diffusivity and run–tumble statistics without tracking individual organisms. Motility models have also been extended to self-propelled particles performing Lévy walks, with applications to Escherichia coli and Euglena gracilis.

In biopolymer and cytoskeletal networks, Fourier-space analysis of microscopy recordings has been used to quantify relaxation and rearrangement dynamics. Methods derived from DDM have measured single-cell displacements and division rates in confluent monolayers without cell tracking. Studies of the Drosophila ooplasm have distinguished active diffusion from advection driven by cytoskeletal activity. DDM measurements of genetically encoded fluorescent nanoparticles have also been used to determine cytoplasmic viscosity, including at particle densities too high for individual tracking.

A proposed diagnostic application uses dark-field DDM to measure the slower diffusion of gold nanoparticle sensors after binding to virus-like particles. The approach has been proposed for label-free quantification of viral load in saliva within 10 to 15 minutes.

== Relationship with other imaging-based scattering methods ==
Scattering-based DDM belongs to the so-called near-field (or deep Fresnel) scattering family, a family of imaging-based scattering methods. Near field is used here in a similar way to what is used for near field speckles i.e. as a particular case of Fresnel region as opposed to the far field or Fraunhofer region. The near field scattering family includes also quantitative shadowgraphy and Schlieren.

== See also ==
- Diffusing-wave spectroscopy
- Fluorescence correlation spectroscopy
- Microrheology
- Nanoparticle tracking analysis
- Particle image velocimetry
- X-ray photon correlation spectroscopy
