= Dynamic light scattering =

Technique for determining size distribution of particles

Hypothetical dynamic light scattering of two samples: Larger particles on the top and smaller particles on the bottom

Dynamic light scattering (DLS) is a technique in physics that can be used to determine the size distribution profile of small particles in suspension or polymers in solution. In the scope of DLS, temporal fluctuations are usually analyzed using the intensity or photon autocorrelation function (also known as photon correlation spectroscopy – PCS or quasi-elastic light scattering – QELS). In the time domain analysis, the autocorrelation function (ACF) usually decays starting from zero delay time, and faster dynamics due to smaller particles lead to faster decorrelation of scattered intensity trace. It has been shown that the intensity ACF is the Fourier transform of the power spectrum, and therefore the DLS measurements can be equally well performed in the spectral domain. DLS can also be used to probe the behavior of complex fluids such as concentrated polymer solutions.

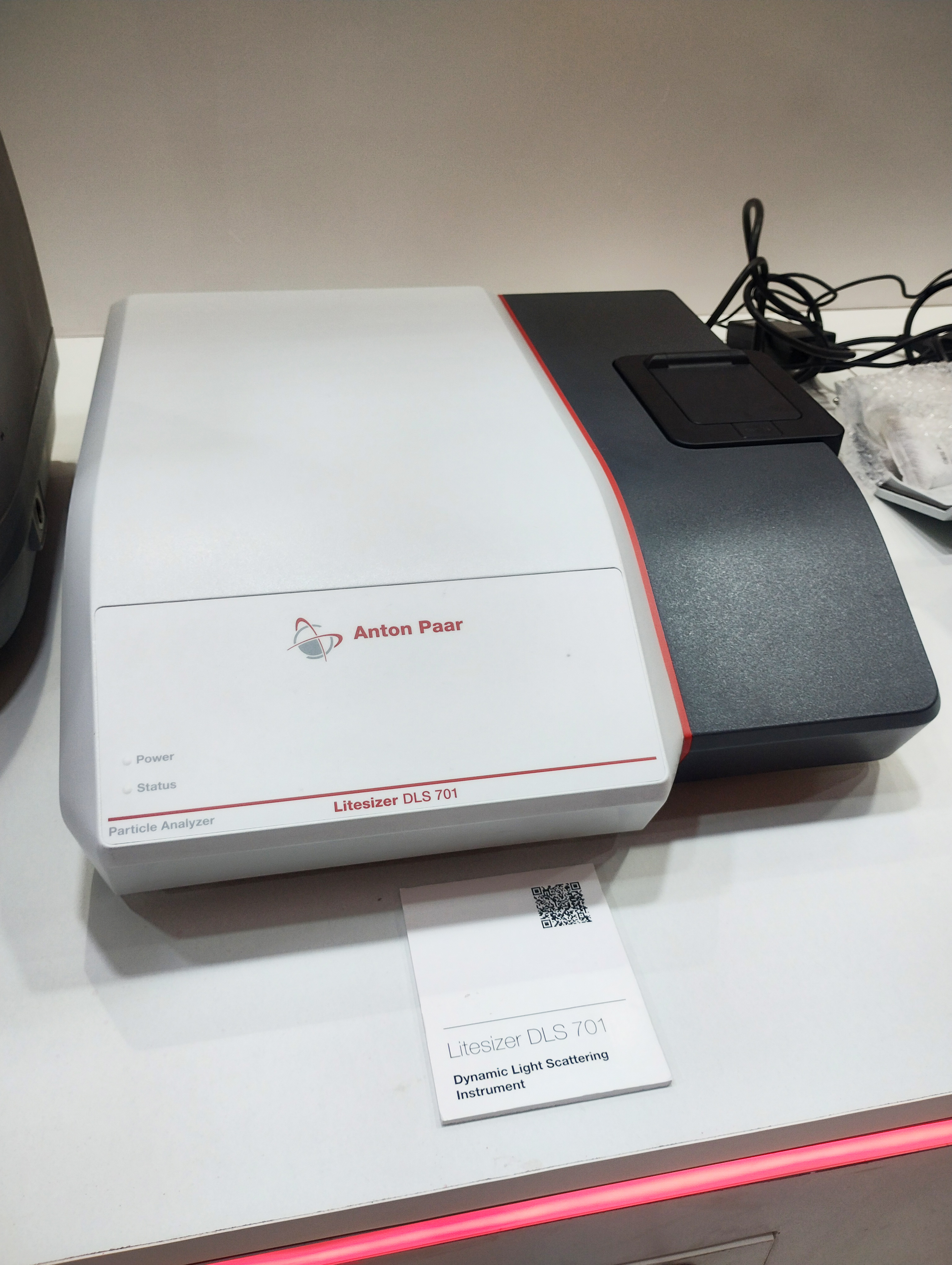
Anton Paar dynamic light scattering instrument at DEF-TECH Bharat 2026, KTPO, Bengaluru

== Setup ==
A monochromatic light source, usually a laser, is shot through a polarizer and into a sample. The scattered light then goes through a second polarizer where it is collected by a photomultiplier and the resulting image is projected onto a screen. This is known as a speckle pattern (Figure 1).

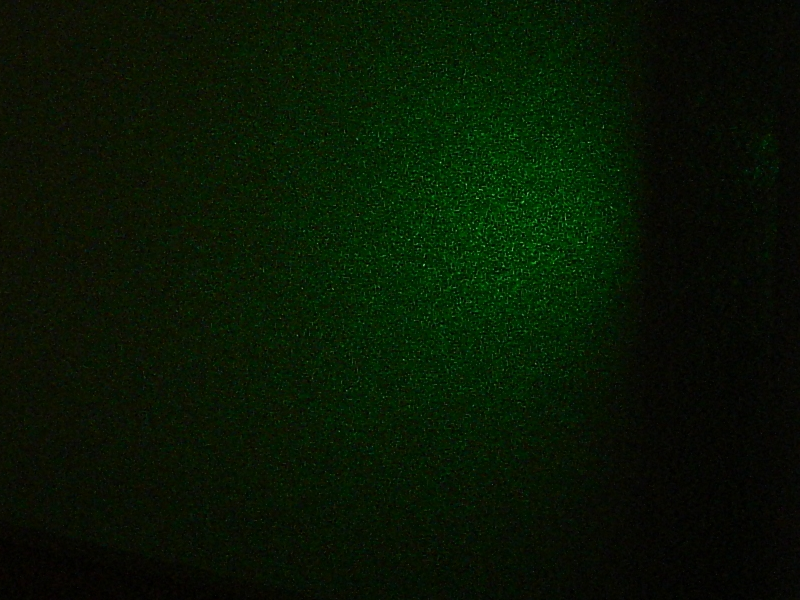
Figure 1. Typical speckle pattern.

All of the molecules in the solution are being hit with the light and all of the molecules diffract the light in all directions. The diffracted light from all of the molecules can either interfere constructively (light regions) or destructively (dark regions). This process is repeated at short time intervals and the resulting set of speckle patterns is analyzed by an autocorrelator that compares the intensity of light at each spot over time. The polarizers can be set up in two geometrical configurations. One is a vertical/vertical (VV) geometry, where the second polarizer allows light through that is in the same direction as the primary polarizer. In vertical/horizontal (VH) geometry the second polarizer allows light that is not in the same direction as the incident light.

== Description ==
When light hits small particles, the light scatters in all directions (Rayleigh scattering) as long as the particles are small compared to the wavelength (below 250 nm). Even if the light source is a laser, and thus is monochromatic and coherent, the scattering intensity fluctuates over time. This fluctuation is due to small particles in suspension undergoing Brownian motion, and so the distance between the scatterers in the solution is constantly changing with time. This scattered light then undergoes either constructive or destructive interference by the surrounding particles, and within this intensity fluctuation, information is contained about the time scale of movement of the scatterers. Sample preparation either by filtration or centrifugation is critical to remove dust and artifacts from the solution.

The dynamic information of the particles is derived from the autocorrelation of the intensity trace recorded during the experiment. The second order autocorrelation curve is generated from the intensity trace as follows:

$$g^2(q;\tau) = \frac{\langle I(t)I(t+\tau)\rangle}{\langle I(t)\rangle^2}$$

where g^{2}(q;τ) is the autocorrelation function at a particular wave vector, q, and delay time, τ, and I is the intensity. The angular brackets $\langle\cdot\rangle$ denote the expected value operator, which in some texts is denoted by a capital E.

At short time delays, the correlation is high because the particles do not have a chance to move to a great extent from the initial state that they were in. The two signals are thus essentially unchanged when compared after only a very short time interval. As the time delays become longer, the correlation decays exponentially, meaning that, after a long period has elapsed, there is no correlation between the scattered intensity of the initial and final states. This exponential decay is related to the motion of the particles, specifically to the diffusion coefficient. To fit the decay (i.e., the autocorrelation function), numerical methods are used, based on calculations of assumed distributions. If the sample is monodisperse (uniform) then the decay is simply a single exponential. The Siegert equation relates the second-order autocorrelation function with the first-order autocorrelation function g^{1}(q;τ) as follows:

$$g^2(q;\tau)= 1+\beta\left[g^1(q;\tau)\right]^2$$

where the first term of the sum is related to the baseline value (≈1) and the parameter β is a correction factor that depends on the geometry and alignment of the laser beam in the light scattering setup. It is roughly equal to the inverse of the number of speckle (see Speckle pattern) from which light is collected. A smaller focus of the laser beam yields a coarser speckle pattern, a lower number of speckle on the detector, and thus a larger second-order autocorrelation. The most important use of the autocorrelation function is its use for size determination.

== Multiple scattering ==
Dynamic light scattering provides insight into the dynamic properties of soft materials by measuring single scattering events, meaning that each detected photon has been scattered by the sample exactly once. In principle, the DLS measurements can be performed with the detector positioned at any angle. The choice of the best angle depends on the sample properties, such as turbidity and particle size. Back scattering detection (e.g., 173° or 175°) is particularly interesting for turbid and highly concentrated samples, which contain large particles. Side scattering detection (90°) is recommended for weakly scattering samples, including small particles and transparent samples. Finally, forward scattering detection (e.g., 13° or 15°) is suitable for detection of samples containing small particles with few large particles. Some DLS instruments in the market also allow automatic angle selection based on a continuous transmittance measurement.

At the lower end of the turbidity range, the Cavity Amplified Scattering Spectroscopy method makes use of an integrating cavity to elongate photon paths through quasi non-scattering samples. As opposed to conventional DLS instruments, this method is angle independent as it probes samples isotropically from all directions.

Even though the DLS measurement using a single-angle detection has been the most diffuse technique, the application to many systems of scientific and industrial relevance has been limited due to often-encountered multiple scattering, wherein photons are scattered multiple times by the sample before being detected. Accurate interpretation becomes exceedingly difficult for systems with non-negligible contributions from multiple scattering. Especially for larger particles and those with high refractive index contrast, this limits the technique to very low particle concentrations, and a large variety of systems are, therefore, excluded from investigations with dynamic light scattering. However, as shown by Schaetzel, it is possible to suppress multiple scattering in dynamic light scattering experiments via a cross-correlation approach. The general idea is to isolate singly scattered light and suppress undesired contributions from multiple scattering in a dynamic light scattering experiment. Different implementations of cross-correlation light scattering have been developed and applied. Currently, the most widely used scheme is the so-called 3D-dynamic light scattering method. The same method can also be used to correct static light scattering data for multiple scattering contributions. Alternatively, in the limit of strong multiple scattering, a variant of dynamic light scattering called diffusing-wave spectroscopy can be applied.

== Data analysis ==
=== Introduction ===
Once the autocorrelation data have been generated, different mathematical approaches can be employed to obtain 'information' from it. Analysis of the scattering is facilitated when particles do not interact through collisions or electrostatic forces between ions. Particle-particle collisions can be suppressed by dilution, and charge effects are reduced by the use of salts to collapse the electrical double layer.

The simplest approach is to treat the first-order autocorrelation function as a single exponential decay. This is appropriate for a monodisperse population.

$$\ g^1(q;\tau)= \exp(-\Gamma\tau)  \,$$

where Γ is the decay rate. The translational diffusion coefficient D_{t} may be derived at a single angle or at a range of angles depending on the wave vector q.

$$\ \Gamma=q^2D_t\,$$

with

$$\ q = \frac{4\pi n_0}{\lambda}\sin\left(\frac{\theta}{2}\right)$$

where λ is the incident laser wavelength, n_{0} is the solvent refractive index and θ is the angle at which the detector is located with respect to the sample cell.

The refractive index of the solvent plays a crucial role in light scattering and is important to calculate the Stokes radius from the Stokes-Einstein equation. Therefore, previous refractive index data from the scattering medium should be evaluated with dedicated instruments, known as refractometers. Alternatively, DLS instruments containing a refractive index measurement module allow a good estimative for this important parameter within ±0.5%, which is the accuracy defined by ISO 22412:2017 for refractive index values required for DLS. Besides the refractive index of the medium, the refractive index of the particles is only necessary when analyzing larger particle size (usually above 100 nm) and volume- or number-weighted size distributions are needed. In these cases, prior knowledge of the refractive index and absorbance of the material is required in order to apply the Mie scattering.

Depending on the anisotropy and polydispersity of the system, a resulting plot of (Γ/q^{2}) vs. q^{2} may or may not show an angular dependence. Small spherical particles will show no angular dependence, hence no anisotropy. A plot of (Γ/q^{2}) vs. q^{2} will result in a horizontal line. Particles with a shape other than a sphere will show anisotropy and thus an angular dependence when plotting (Γ/q^{2}) vs. q^{2}. The intercept will be in any case the D_{t}. Thus, there is an optimum angle of detection θ for each particle size. A high-quality analysis should always be performed at several scattering angles (multiangle DLS). This becomes even more important in a polydisperse sample with an unknown particle size distribution. At certain angles the scattering intensity of some particles will completely overwhelm the weak scattering signal of other particles, thus making them invisible to the data analysis at this angle. DLS instruments which only work at a fixed angle can only deliver good results for some particles. Thus, the indicated precision of a DLS instrument with only one detection angle is only ever true for certain particles.

D_{t} is often used to calculate the hydrodynamic radius of a sphere through the Stokes–Einstein equation. The size determined by dynamic light scattering is the size of a sphere that moves in the same manner as the scatterer. So, for example, if the scatterer is a random coil polymer, the determined size is not the same as the radius of gyration determined by static light scattering. It is also useful to point out that the obtained size will include any other molecules or solvent molecules that move with the particle. So, for example, colloidal gold with a layer of surfactant will appear larger by dynamic light scattering (which includes the surfactant layer) than by transmission electron microscopy (which does not "see" the layer due to poor contrast).

In most cases, samples are polydisperse. Thus, the autocorrelation function is a sum of the exponential decays corresponding to each of the species in the population.

$$g^1(q;\tau)= \sum_{i=1}^n G_i(\Gamma_i)\exp(-\Gamma_i\tau) = \int G(\Gamma)\exp(-\Gamma\tau)\,d\Gamma.$$

It is tempting to obtain data for g^{1}(q;τ) and attempt to invert the above to extract G(Γ). Since G(Γ) is proportional to the relative scattering from each species, it contains information on the distribution of sizes. However, this is known as an ill-posed problem. The methods described below (and others) have been developed to extract as much useful information as possible from an autocorrelation function.

=== Cumulant method ===
One of the most common methods is the cumulant method, from which in addition to the sum of the exponentials above, more information can be derived about the variance of the system as follows:

$$\ g^1(q;\tau) = \exp\left(-\bar{\Gamma}\left(\tau - \frac{\mu_2}{2!}\tau^2 + \frac{\mu_3}{3!}\tau^3 + \cdots\right)\right)$$

where Γ̅ is the average decay rate and μ_{2}/Γ̅^{2} is the second order polydispersity index (or an indication of the variance). A third-order polydispersity index may also be derived but this is necessary only if the particles of the system are highly polydisperse. The z-averaged translational diffusion coefficient D_{z} may be derived at a single angle or at a range of angles depending on the wave vector q.

$$\ \bar{\Gamma}=q^2D_z\,$$

One must note that the cumulant method is valid for small τ and sufficiently narrow G(Γ). One should seldom use parameters beyond μ_{3}, because overfitting data with many parameters in a power-series expansion will render all the parameters, including $\scriptstyle \bar{\Gamma}$ and μ_{2}, less precise. The cumulant method is far less affected by experimental noise than the methods below.

=== Size-distribution function ===
The particle size distribution can also be obtained using the autocorrelation function. However, polydisperse samples are not well resolved by the cumulant fit analysis. Thus, the combination of non-negative least squares (NNLS) algorithms with regularization methods, such as the Tikhonov regularization, can be used to resolve multimodal samples. An important feature of the NNLS optimization is the regularization term used to identify specific solutions and minimize the deviation between the measure data and the fit. There is no ideal regularization term that is suitable for all samples. The shape of this term can determine if the solution will represent a general broad distribution with small number of peaks or if narrow and discrete populations will be fit. Alternatively, the calculation of the particle size distribution is performed using the CONTIN algorithm.

=== CONTIN algorithm ===
An alternative method for analyzing the autocorrelation function can be achieved through an inverse Laplace transform known as CONTIN developed by Steven Provencher. The CONTIN analysis is ideal for heterodisperse, polydisperse, and multimodal systems that cannot be resolved with the cumulant method. The resolution for separating two different particle populations is approximately a factor of five or higher and the difference in relative intensities between two different populations should be less than 1:10^{−5}.

=== Maximum entropy method ===
The Maximum entropy method is an analysis method that has great developmental potential. The method is also used for the quantification of sedimentation velocity data from analytical ultracentrifugation. The maximum entropy method involves several iterative steps to minimize the deviation of the fitted data from the experimental data and subsequently reduce the χ^{2} of the fitted data.

== Scattering of non-spherical particles ==
If the particle in question is not spherical, the rotational motion must be considered as well because the scattering of the light will be different depending on orientation. According to Pecora, rotational Brownian motion will affect the scattering when a particle fulfills two conditions; they must be both optically and geometrically anisotropic. Rod-shaped molecules fulfill these requirements, so a rotational diffusion coefficient must be considered in addition to a translational diffusion coefficient. In its most succinct form, the equation appears as

$$\frac{A}{B} = \frac{5}{4} \frac{4\Mu_p+2\Nu\Mu_l\Mu_p+\Mu_l}{\Mu_p-\Nu+\Mu_l}$$

Where A/B is the ratio of the two relaxation modes (translational and rotational), M_{p} contains information about the axis perpendicular to the central axis of the particle, and M_{l} contains information about the axis parallel to the central axis.

In 2007, Peter R. Lang and his team decided to use dynamic light scattering to determine the particle length and aspect ratio of short gold nanorods. They chose this method since it does not destroy the sample and it has a relatively easy setup. Both relaxation states were observed in VV geometry and the diffusion coefficients of both motions were used to calculate the aspect ratios of the gold nanoparticles.

== Applications ==
DLS is used to characterize the size of various particles including proteins, polymers, micelles, Protein cages and virus-like particles, vesicles, carbohydrates, nanoparticles, biological cells, and gels. If the system is not disperse in size, the mean effective diameter of the particles can be determined. This measurement depends on the size of the particle core, the size of surface structures, particle concentration, and the type of ions in the medium.

Since DLS essentially measures fluctuations in scattered light intensity due to diffusing particles, the diffusion coefficient of the particles can be determined. DLS software of commercial instruments typically displays the particle population at different diameters. If the system is monodisperse, there should only be one population, whereas a polydisperse system would show multiple particle populations. If there is more than one size population present in a sample then either the CONTIN analysis should be applied for photon correlation spectroscopy instruments, or the power spectrum method should be applied for Doppler shift instruments.

Stability studies can be done conveniently using DLS. Periodical DLS measurements of a sample can show whether the particles aggregate over time by seeing whether the hydrodynamic radius of the particle increases. If particles aggregate, there will be a larger population of particles with a larger radius. In some DLS machines, stability depending on temperature can be analyzed by controlling the temperature in situ.

== See also ==
- Differential dynamic microscopy
- Differential static light scatter (DSLS)
- Diffusing-wave spectroscopy
- Diffusion coefficient
- Fluorescence correlation spectroscopy
- Interferometric scattering microscopy
- Light scattering
- Multi-angle light scattering
- Nanoparticle tracking analysis (NTA)
- Protein–protein interactions
- Scanning ion occlusion sensing
- Static light scattering (SLS)
- Single particle extinction and scattering (SPES)
- Stokes radius
