= Differential static light scatter =

Differential static light scatter (DSLS) is a term coined to represent the change in total light scatter of a system over time or temperature in a static environment.

Static light scattering or SLS and its many types are well outlined in literature and is the base principal for DSLS but varies specifically in that the difference (before and after) is the focus of this measurement. Typically the system will commence measurement at T_{0} and over the course of time measure the change in light scatter. One of the more practical applications of DSLS is in the area of proteomic research and protein based chemistry. Solution conditions can be varied across samples of a specific protein in a screening scenario and the system can be kept at either a static temperature or be ramped up, or in some cases down. The change will be observed over time and the focus of the calculation is on the amount of change in signal from T_{0} to T_{final} . This method of analysis provides researchers with data that helps them predict a protein or compound's stability in various conditions and further, in the case of proteomic structural work, can help identify the best protein candidates, and their optimal conditions to crystallize and thereby undergo x-ray crystallography for structural analysis.

There are other technologies or techniques using similar concepts such as DLS (dynamic light scattering) to obtain this information with the help of fluorophores and the use of lasers for excitation however the primary focus in this arena is on particle sizing. Also DLS has a greater focus in 'flow-based' instrumentation. Many proteins are discovered on an annual basis and in the field of drug discovery it is very important characterize the structure of a novel peptides as well as the best conditions to keep them in solution. Because of this staggering number of potential therapeutics churning out of this research sector today there is a strong need for instrumentation to best capture this data and to date there are a few solutions that are DSLS focused. One such oriented instrument designed for high throughput scenarios utilizing standard HTS (high-throughput screening) SBS standard type plates (or automation friendly) is the StarGazer2.

There are other solutions also available that have either wider focus to include particular sizing and Zeta potential but are limited but are limited by how many samples can be run at once, thus, non-HTS. As DSLS in principal measures particles as they either aggregate (or grow larger) or, in theory, breakdown and grow smaller, this technology and method of measurement will pull in a number of great applications in the future in the food and beverage, or environmental sector as the technology is stretched into new applications beyond proteomics.
