= Particle technology =

Science of the processing of particles and powders

Particle technology is the science and technology of handling and processing particles and powders. It encompasses the production, handling, modification, and use of a wide variety of particulate materials, including both wet and dry forms. Particle handling can involve transportation and storage. Particle sizes can range from nanometers to centimeters. Particles are characterized by a variety of metrics. Particle technology spans many industries, including chemical, petrochemical, agricultural, food, pharmaceuticals, mineral processing, civil engineering, advanced materials, energy, and the environment.

== Subjects of particle technology ==
Particle technology thus deals with:

- Behaviour of solids in bulk, including soil mechanics, bulk material handling, silos, conveying, powder metallurgy, nanotechnology;
- Size reduction including crushing and grinding;
- Increasing size by flocculation, granulation, powder compaction, tableting, and crystallization;
- Particle separation, such as sieving, tabling, flotation, magnetic separation, and/or electrostatic precipitation, fluidization, centrifugal separation, and liquid filtration;
- Analytical procedures such as particle size analysis.

== Particle characterization ==
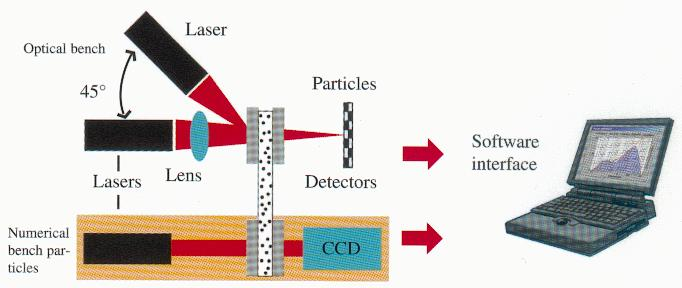
Particle size analysis schematic

Particles are characterized by their individual size and shape, and by the distribution of these properties in bulk quantities. Spherical particles are defined by diameter or radius, and non-spherical particles are defined by the dimensions of their geometric equivalent. The space between particles in bulk means that the bulk density is less than the density of individual particles. The difference between bulk density and particle density may have implications for storage, transportation or other handling of particles. The way in which they move over each other or lock together determines stability or flowability, which is tested by the triaxial shear test.

Particle samples can be visualized using microscopy, most commonly by scanning electron microscopy (SEM) or transmission electron microscopy (TEM). Both SEM and TEM can determine pore structure, surface area and structure of a particle. SEM achieves particle visualization by directing a beam of electrons at the particle sample and creating signals upon interaction with the sample, building a 3D image of the sample's topography and surface structure. TEM uses a similar beam of electrons, but the electrons are directed at a thin slice of the sample to form an image of the electrons that pass through the slice. Particle microscopy can reveal properties or defects in a particle.

Optics can quantify particle size. Measuring light scattering and diffraction caused by a particle are detectable methods of identifying particle size, and are commonly used in the following techniques:

- Laser phase Doppler shift: Incident light on a particle is not uniformly distributed, as it is partially reflected and refracted in multiple directions. Particle velocity can be calculated using the Doppler frequency from any signal, while the phase difference between two detectors determines particle size.
- Fraunhofer diffraction: When a particle is at least 10 times larger than the laser wavelength and the scattering angle is 30° or smaller, the light intensity distribution pattern can be used to calculate the particle size.

== Production and applications ==
Many industries use particle technologies for particle transportation, separation and fluidization. A variety of production methods are required for particulate materials due to the large differences between them. Three major areas of production techniques and their common applications are listed below.

=== Size enlargement ===
Agglomeration is the process of primary particles (of smaller size) coming into contact with each other and forming larger clusters. It occurs in dry powders when particle size is smaller than around 10 μm or when conditions are humid, and in liquids when particles have zero surface charge. It is often induced by Brownian motion in liquids.

Aggregation is another process of forming clusters from particles, but where the particles have stronger bonds due to larger surface area of contact. It occurs mostly in homogenous liquid mixtures.

Crystallization, either in batches or continuous processes, allows the formation of high-purity crystalline particles from solutions. The product usually has particle size in the millimeter range.

Precipitation also forms particulate product from solution. It occurs from two soluble compounds forming an insoluble product in a medium, often aqueous. While the initial particle size of the precipitate formed is only in the nanometer range, the primary particles often spontaneously agglomerate or aggregate to form much larger particles. Polymerization is a special form of precipitation where minimally soluble monomers in an aqueous solution form emulsion droplets with zero solubility.

Granulation is the process of forming granular material from powders or smaller particles. It occurs when a binder liquid is mixed with ingredient particles to form compact clusters. These clusters can be further processed and compressed into tablet form for other applications.

Extrusion forms objects of a fixed cross-sectional shape when the starting material is pushed through a die with the desired cross-section. This technique is often used for plastic, metal and rubber granules. In the food industry, extrusion is also used extensively for making pasta, crouton, cereal, cookie dough, pet food, etc. to achieve uniformity of these items.

=== Size reduction ===
Comminution is the mechanical reduction of the size of solid materials. It includes crushing, cutting, grinding, milling, vibrating, and other processes. Crushing and cutting breaks down large pieces of dry or tough material to the centimeter range. Milling can be applied to both dry and wet material, resulting in particle size in the millimeter range.

Atomization is the process of breaking liquids into a spray of much smaller droplets, like an aerosol. The resulting size of these particles or droplets is usually in the nanometer to micrometer range. There are many industrial applications of liquid atomization, including spray drying, film coating, making nano-emulsions, etc. Other applications include fire sprinklers, crop sprayers, dry shampoos, etc.

=== Emulsification ===
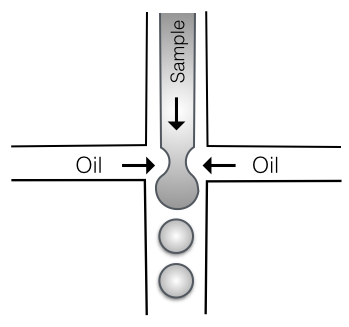
Oil emulsion technique.

Emulsification is the process of dispersing particles from two or more immiscible liquids together. Oftentimes, one of the immiscible liquids is aqueous (water as solvent) and the other is organic (oil as solvent). Industrial processes usually involve dispersion of the organic solution into the aqueous solution by mixing with high-energy shears or strong turbulence. Due to the unstable nature of emulsions, surfactants or emulsifiers are required to stabilize the final product to achieve longer shelf life. Common applications of emulsions include food, pharmaceuticals and lubricants. Some examples of food emulsions are milk, mayonnaise, butter, and ice cream. Some examples of pharmaceutical and lubricant emulsions are ointments, creams, oil-soluble vitamins, and some medications.
