= Malvern Panalytical =

Manufacturer and supplier of laboratory analytical instruments

- Type: Private Limited Company
- Industry: Instrumentation
- Founded: Malvern, Worcestershire, United Kingdom 1971
- Headquarters: Malvern, Worcestershire, United Kingdom; Almelo, Netherlands
- Key people: Christian Sauber, President
- Revenue: GBP 448.2 million (2019)
- Number of employees: Globally: 2,400
- Parent: Spectris
- Website: www.malvernpanalytical.com
- Footnotes: Name, Type; Key People; Revenue; Employees; Parent

Malvern Panalytical is a Spectris plc company. The company is a manufacturer and supplier of laboratory analytical instruments. It has been influential in the development of the Malvern Correlator, and it remains notable for its work in the advancement of particle sizing technology. The company produces technology for materials analysis and principal instruments designed to measure the size, shape and charge of particles. Additional areas of development include equipment for rheology measurements, chemical imaging and chromatography. In 2017, they merged with PANalytical to form Malvern Panalytical Ltd.

== History ==
Malvern Instruments Ltd. was incorporated in 1971. In 1977, Malvern Instruments was recognised by the Royal Academy of Engineering, jointly with the Royal Signals and Radar Establishment (RSRE), for developing the Malvern Correlator. It also received the MacRobert Award for Outstanding Technical Innovation (1977), the Queen's Award for Technological Achievement (1977), the Queen's Award for Export Achievement (1981), and the Queen's Award for Export & Technology (1988).

In 1992, Burnfield acquired Malvern Instruments from Cray Electronics Holdings, and, in 1996, there was the acquisition of A3 Water Solutions GmbH, a Stuttgart-based specialist in the design, marketing, and manufacturing of air and liquid particle counters. In 1997, Malvern was also acquired by the Fairey Aviation Company, and Insitec Inc from Burnfield PLC.

The holding company changed its name to Spectris plc in 2001. In 2003, they acquired Bohlin Instruments Ltd, a Gloucestershire-based manufacturer of rheology and viscosity instruments. They also acquired Spectral Dimensions Inc, a manufacturer of infrared chemical imaging instruments, in 2006. Malvern received the 2006 Queen's Award for International Trade.

Viscotek Corp, manufacturer of chromatographic and laboratory equipment and supplies, was acquired in 2008, as well as Reologica Instruments AB, a Lund-based manufacturer of rheology and viscometry instrumentation, in 2010. Malvern received the 2010 Queen's Award for Innovation. The company was also listed as a 2010 winner of the annual Queen's Awards for Enterprise for its work measuring particles in fluids.

In 2013, they acquired NanoSight, a Wiltshire-based manufacturer of nanoparticle characterization instruments, and, in 2014, the Northampton-based manufacturer of Thermodynamic analysis instruments, MicroCal Instruments, was acquired from GE Lifesciences.

In 2017, they merged with PANalytical to form Malvern Panalytical Ltd. That same year, Malvern Panalytical released their X-ray fluorescence (XRF) spectrometer Epsilon, which was specifically designed for small spot analysis. In 2018, Malvern Panalytical unveiled Empyrean, the first fully automated multipurpose x-ray diffractometer; Claisse LeDoser-12, an Automatic Dispensing Balance; Morphologi Range, a new morphologically-directed raman spectroscopy system, and Epsilon 4, a benchtop x-ray fluorescence spectrometer.

Malvern Panalytical launched a new partnership with SCOTT Technology Ltd., a supplier of sample preparation equipment, in 2020. Their contract included engineering a fully automated robotic analytical system, incorporating fusion bead sample preparation, implementing X-ray spectrometry instrumentation, and developing thermogravimetric analysis (TGA) equipment. The company also joined partnership with Concept Life Sciences that year. Netzsch acquired Malvern Panalytical’s rheometer product lines in February 2020. In this acquisition, Malvern Panalytical extended Netzsch’s product portfolio by providing Kinexus rotational rheometers and Rosand capillary rheometers. In September 2020, Malvern Panalytical received the Physikalisch-Technische Bundesanstalt (PTB) type approval, as a “full-protection” X-ray instrument, for its Aeris range of benchtop XRD diffractometers.

== Business model ==
Malvern Instruments began with a focus on particle sizing. As it grew, this focus changed toward developing a "broad portfolio of analytical solutions". In 2014, the company's CTO expressed the company's focus as "We want to solve analytical bottlenecks".

In order to maintain agility and currency in product development, the company built an isolated internal division, the Bioscience Development Initiative based in Columbia, Maryland, which has an entrepreneurial character and freedom from corporate management constraints; the unit aims to rapidly develop technologies in partnership with scientists and engineers from the pharmaceutical and other industries and academia. This unit focuses on the biopharmaceutical sector, specifically formulation of drug products.

PANalytical originally began in 1948 as a branch of Philips under the name of Philips Analytical, which developed XRF (X-Ray Fluorescence) and XRD (X-Ray Diffraction) equipment. In 2002, Philips Analytical was officially renamed to PANalytical after Spectris’ acquisition of this x-ray analytical branch. Malvern later merged with PANalytical to become Malvern Panalytical Ltd. in 2017.

== Operations ==
As part of the materials analysis sector, Malvern Panalytical derives most of its revenue through sales of a range of particle and material characterisation instruments. These systems have applications across many industries including: pharmaceuticals, life sciences, metallurgy, mining, semiconductors, polymer science, protein science and food production.

== Products ==
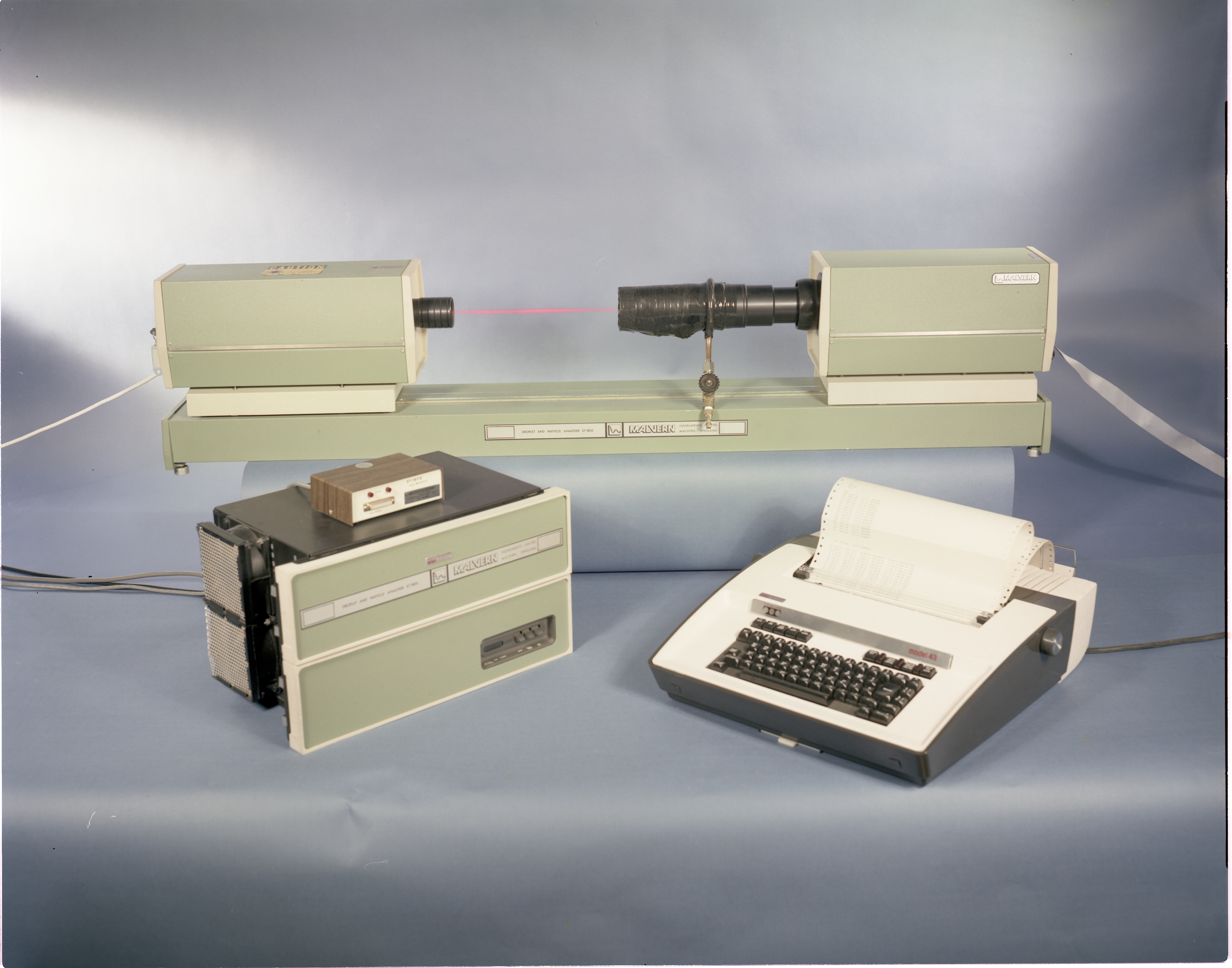
Malvern droplet and particle analyser

- Spraytec droplet size system
- Mastersizer laser diffraction systems
- Zetasizer particle size systems
- Wavelength Dispersive X-ray fluorescence (WDXRF) wafer analyzers and spectrometers
- Morphologi G4 particle characterisation systems
- Sysmex FPIA-3000 particle characterisation system
- Near Infrared Chemical Imaging (NIR-CI) systems
- Rheometry systems
- Viscotek chromatography systems

Full products include:

- 2830 ZT
- Aeris
- Archimedes
- ASD range
- Axios FAST
- Claisse range
- CNA range
- Empyrean range
- Epsilon range
- Insitec range
- Mastersize range
- MicroCal range
- NanoSight range
- OMNISEC
- Parsum range
- Spraytec
- X’Pert
- Zetasizer
- Zetium
