= Nanoparticle tracking analysis =

Method for visualizing and analyzing particles in liquids

Nanoparticle tracking analysis (NTA) is a method for visualizing and analyzing particles in liquids that relates the rate of Brownian motion to particle size. The rate of movement is related only to the viscosity and temperature of the liquid; it is not influenced by particle density or refractive index. NTA allows the determination of a size distribution profile of small particles with a diameter of approximately 10–1000 nm in liquid suspension.

The technique is used in conjunction with an ultramicroscope and a laser illumination unit that together allow small particles in liquid suspension to be visualized moving under Brownian motion. The light scattered by the particles is captured using a CCD or EMCCD camera over multiple frames. Computer software is then used to track the motion of each particle from frame to frame. The rate of particle movement is related to a sphere equivalent hydrodynamic radius as calculated through the Stokes–Einstein equation. The technique calculates particle size on a particle-by particle basis, overcoming inherent weaknesses in ensemble techniques such as dynamic light scattering. Since video clips form the basis of the analysis, accurate characterization of real time events such as aggregation and dissolution is possible. Samples require minimal preparation, minimizing the time required to process each sample. Speculators suggest that eventually the analysis may be done in real-time with no preparation, e.g. when detecting the presence of airborne viruses or biological weapons.

NTA currently operates for particles from about 10 to 1000 nm in diameter, depending on particle type. Analysis of particles at the lowest end of this range is possible only for particles composed of materials with a high refractive index, such as gold and silver. The upper size limit is restricted by the limited Brownian motion of large particles; because a large particle moves very slowly, accuracy is diminished. The viscosity of the solvent also influences the movement of particles, and it, too, plays a part in determining the upper size limit for a specific system.

== Applications ==
NTA has been used by commercial, academic, and government laboratories working with nanoparticle toxicology, drug delivery, exosomes, microvesicles, bacterial membrane vesicles, and other small biological particles, virology and vaccine production, ecotoxicology, protein aggregation, orthopedic implants, inks and pigments, and nanobubbles.

== iNTA ==
Interferometric nanoparticle tracking analysis (iNTA) is the next generation of NTA technology. It is based on interferometric scattering microscopy (iSCAT), which enhances the signal of weak scatterers. In contrast to NTA, iNTA has a superior resolution based on a two-parameter analysis, including the size and the scattering cross-section of the particle.

== Comparison to dynamic light scattering ==
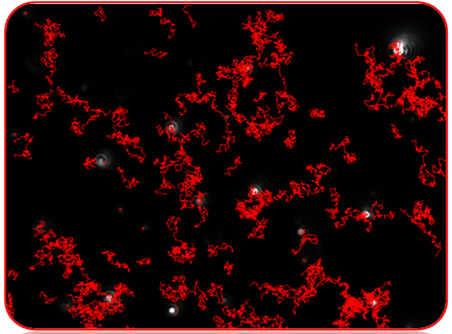
Typical image produced by NTA.

Both dynamic light scattering (DLS) and nanoparticle tracking analysis (NTA) measure the Brownian motion of nanoparticles whose speed of motion, or diffusion constant, Dt, is related to particle size through the Stokes–Einstein equation.

$${(x,y)^2\over 4} = Dt = {K_bT\over 3 \pi \eta d}t$$

where

- Dt is the diffusion constant, a product of diffusion coefficient D and time t
- k_{B} is the Boltzmann constant,
- T is the absolute temperature,
- η is viscosity
- d is the diameter of the spherical particle.

In NTA this motion is analyzed by video – individual particle positional changes are tracked in two dimensions from which the particle diffusion is determined. Knowing Dt, the particle hydrodynamic diameter can be then determined.

In contrast, DLS does not visualize the particles individually but analyzes, using a digital correlator, the time dependent scattering intensity fluctuations. These fluctuations are caused by interference effects arising from the relative Brownian movements of an ensemble of a large number of particles within a sample. Through analysis of the resultant exponential autocorrelation function, average particle size can be calculated as well as a polydispersity index. For multi-exponential autocorrelation functions arising from polydisperse samples, deconvolution can give limited information about the particle size distribution profile.

== History ==
NTA and related technologies were developed by Bob Carr. Along with John Knowles, Carr founded NanoSight Ltd in 2003. This United Kingdom-based company, of which Knowles is the chairman and Carr is the chief technology officer, manufactures instruments that use NTA to detect and analyze small particles in industrial and academic laboratories. In 2004 Particle Metrix GmbH was founded in Germany by Hanno Wachernig. Particle Metrix makes the ZetaView, which operates on the same NTA principle but uses different optics and fluidics in an attempt to improve sampling, zeta potential, and fluorescence detection.

== See also ==
- Dynamic light scattering (DLS)
- Single particle extinction and scattering (SPES)
- NanoSight Ltd
