= NanoSight =

NanoSight Ltd.
- Type: Limited
- Industry: Nanotechnology
- Founded: 2003
- Founder: Bob Carr and John Knowles
- Headquarters: Malvern, United Kingdom
- Area served: International
- Key people: Chairman: John Knowles; CEO: Jeremy Warren; CTO: Bob Carr; Financial director: Roger Humm; Non-executive director: Hugh Stewart
- Products: LM10, NS300, NS500
- Number of employees: 25 (UK)
- Website: Malvern Instruments

NanoSight Ltd is a company that designs and manufactures instruments for the scientific analysis of nanoparticles that are between approximately ten nanometers (nm) and one micron (μm) in diameter. The company was founded in 2003 by Bob Carr and John Knowles to further develop a technique Bob Carr had invented to visualize nanoparticles suspended in liquid. The company has since developed the technique of Nanoparticle Tracking Analysis (NTA), and they produce a series of instruments to count, size and visualize nanoparticles in liquid suspension using this patented technology.

NanoSight has 25 employees in the UK and has received several awards and recognitions. More than 450 instruments had been sold as of 2012. The technology has been cited in over 1300 scientific publications, presentations and reports.

NanoSight was acquired by Malvern Instruments on 30 September 2013.

== Product overview ==
NanoSight develops and produces instruments that visualize, characterize and measure small particles in suspension. Detected particles may be as small as 10 nm in diameter, depending on composition. NanoSight instruments can analyze particle size, concentration, aggregation, and zeta potential. An optional fluorescence mode, employing an optical filter, allows speciation of fluorescently labeled particles.

Each instrument comprises a scientific camera, a microscope, and a sample viewing unit (LM12 or LM14). The viewing unit uses a laser diode to illuminate particles in liquid suspension that are held within or advanced through a flow chamber within the unit. The instrument is used in conjunction with a computer control unit that runs a custom-designed Nanoparticle Tracking Analysis (NTA) software package. NTA analyzes videos captured using the instrument, giving a particle size distribution and particle count based upon tracking of each particle's Brownian motion. Tracking is carried out for all particles in the laser scattering volume to produce a particle size distribution using the Stokes-Einstein equation, relating the Brownian motion of a particle to a sphere-equivalent hydrodynamic radius.

== Instruments ==
Several instruments are currently available.

General specifications:

- Nanoparticle analysis range: typically 10–1000 nm, dependent on particle material
- Particle type: any
- Solvent: any non-corrosive solvent and water. A range of solvent-resistant seals are available.
- Power requirement (own adapter supplied): 110–220 V
- Laser output: Various. 40 mW at 640 nm (Class 1 Laser Product) for basic LM10 and LM20 models. Other lasers are available.
- Viewing chamber volume requirements: 0.3 ml (most models) or 0.1 ml (NS500, although larger volumes must be loaded into the fluidics system if sample is not directly injected)

=== LM10 ===
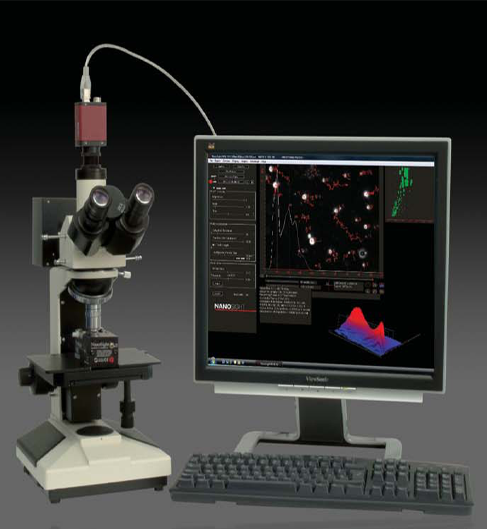
An LM10 Instrument

NanoSight's LM10 instrument is based upon a conventional optical microscope fitted with a scientific camera (CCD, EMCCD or sCMOS) and either the LM12 or LM14 viewing unit. Using a laser light source with a wavelength of 405 nm (blue), 532 nm (green), or 638 nm (red), the particles in the sample are illuminated and the scattered light is captured by the camera and displayed on the connected personal computer running Nanoparticle Tracking Analysis (NTA) software.

Using NTA, the particles are automatically tracked and sized. Results are displayed as a frequency size distribution graph and are exported in various, user-selected formats including spreadsheets and video files. Additionally, information-rich videos clips may be captured and archived for future reference and alternative analyses. The LM10 is proven with most nanoparticle classes down to 10 nm (dependent upon particle density) dispersed in a wide range of solvents.

=== LM10-HS ===
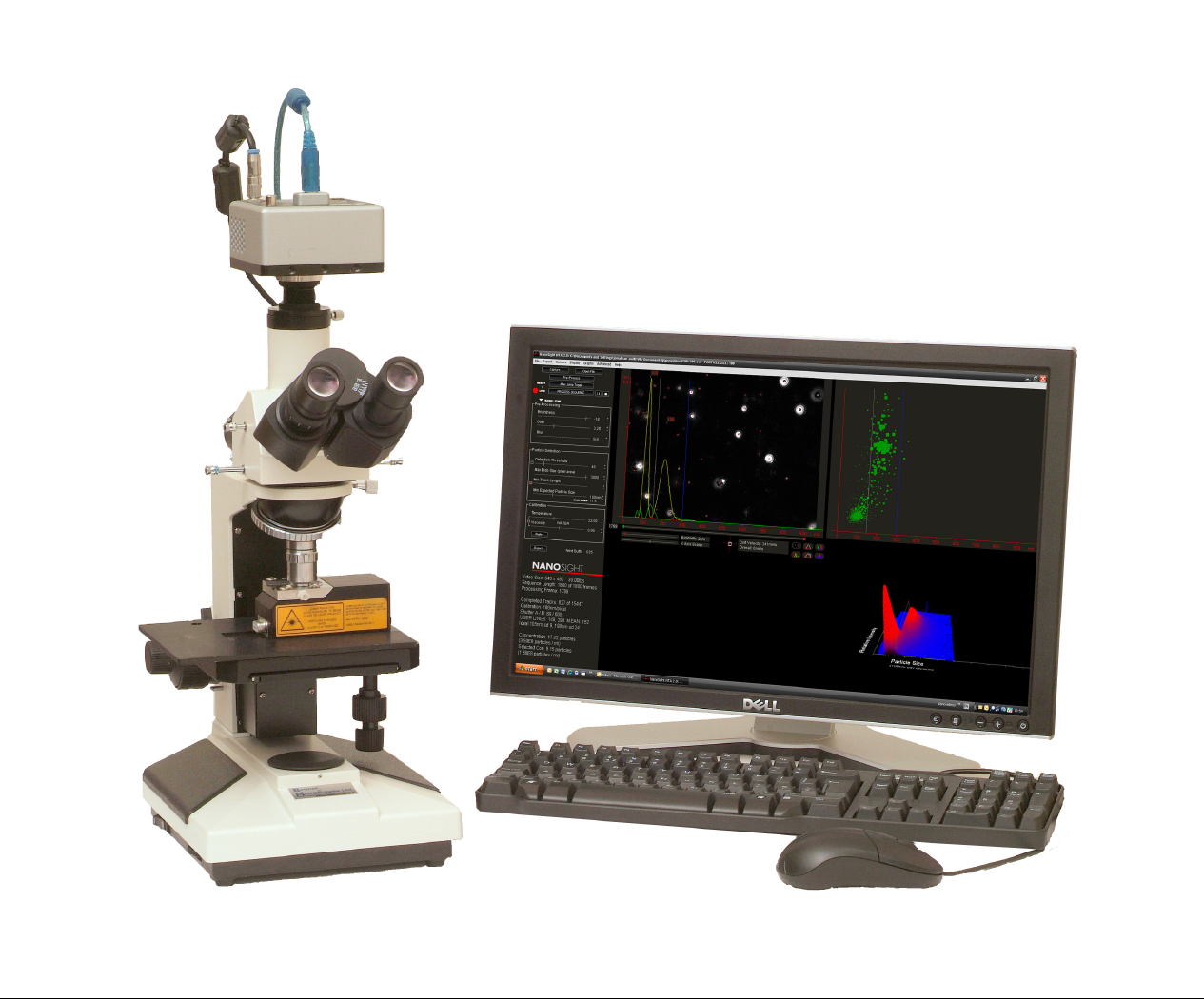
An LM10-HS Instrument

The LM10-HS instrument is similar to the standard LM10 unit but has a higher sensitivity sCMOS camera (EMCCD in earlier models). This allows smaller, lower refractive index particles to be analyzed.

The LM10-HS is more commonly used for sizing biological samples including viruses and vaccines.

=== LM20 ===
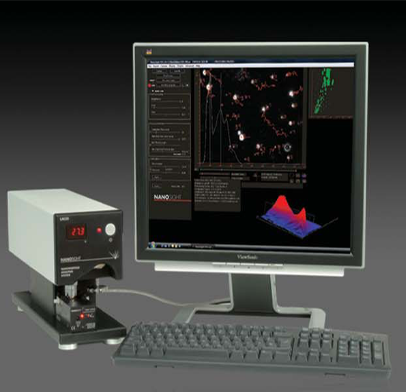
An LM20 Instrument

NanoSight's LM20 is, in essence, a 'boxed-up' LM10, designed and created for greater ease of use. Using the same standard LM12 viewing unit as the LM10, this instrument provides identical results to those obtained in analyses run on an LM10 system. Typically, the LM20 is used in more industrial applications, such as analyzing particles used in paints, pigments, cosmetics, and foodstuffs. The LM20 is ideal for users unfamiliar with using a microscope.

=== NS500 ===
The NS500 incorporates multiple automated features, including computer-controlled peristaltic pumps and stage positioning, for reproducibility and ease of use. Through the interface of the NTA Software Suite, the fluidics system may be used to inject samples into a small viewing chamber, dilute samples to a specified degree, flush the system between samples, or clean and dry the viewing chamber. In contrast with earlier models, the NS500 does not require manual cleaning of the viewing chamber between each sample, thus increasing throughput. Optical stage positions may be set for optical and fluorescent readings, improving reproducibility. Sample temperature control is also programmable. The NS500 can be used for both static as flow measurement using the additional syringe pump. A sample changer can provide enhanced throughput for static measurements, and using scripts high-throughput measurements under flow are available as well.

=== NS200 ===
Like the LM20, but with a high-sensitivity camera like that of the NS500, the NS200 has a housing and is ideal for use in industrial settings, such as manufacture of inks, paints, pigments, petrochemicals, and vaccines. Its configuration is designed for study of small or otherwise weakly scattering nanoparticles, such as viruses, phage, liposomes and other drug delivery nanoparticles, and protein aggregates. It can be used in a non-laboratory environment by individuals unfamiliar with microscopes.

== Applications ==
NanoSight instruments are used for a variety of applications, including:

- Ceramic and metallic nanoparticles
- Pigments, paints and sun creams
- Exosomes, microvesicles, outer membrane vesicles, and other small biological particles
- Pharmaceutical particles - liposomes
- Viruses
- Carbon nanotubes (multi-walled)
- Colloidal suspensions and polymer particles
- Cosmetics and foodstuffs
- Particles in fuels and oils (soot, catalyst, wax etc.)
- Wear debris in lubricants
- Chemical Mechanical Polishing Slurries
- Nanotoxicology studies

In 2011, the European Union (EU) announced that companies that use nanoparticles in their products may be required to report the quantity and size of their nanomaterials. NanoSight suggests that its products will be important for companies seeking to satisfy the new requirements.

== Recognition ==
- Queen's Awards for Enterprise; Innovation (2013)
- Queen's Award for Enterprise in International Trade (2012)
- Technology World Business Innovation Award (2011)
- Winner, Deloitte Technology Fast 50 (2011)

== See also ==
- Nanoparticle Tracking Analysis
- Malvern Instruments
