= Erythrocyte deformability =

Ability of red blood cells to deform under stress without rupturing

In hematology, erythrocyte deformability refers to the ability of erythrocytes (red blood cells, RBCs) to change shape under a given level of applied stress without hemolysing (rupturing). This is an important property because erythrocytes must change their shape extensively under the influence of mechanical forces in fluid flow or while passing through microcirculation (see hemodynamics). The extent and geometry of this shape change can be affected by the mechanical properties of the erythrocytes, the magnitude of the applied forces, and the orientation of erythrocytes with the applied forces. Deformability is an intrinsic cellular property of erythrocytes determined by geometric and material properties of the cell membrane, although as with many measurable properties the ambient conditions may also be relevant factors in any given measurement. No other cells of mammalian organisms have deformability comparable with erythrocytes; furthermore, non-mammalian erythrocytes are not deformable to an extent comparable with mammalian erythrocytes. In human RBCs there are structural supports that aid resilience, which include the cytoskeleton: actin and spectrin that are held together by ankyrin.

== The phenomenon ==
Shape change of erythrocytes under applied forces (i.e., shear forces in blood flow) is reversible and the biconcave-discoid shape, which is normal for most mammals, is maintained after the removal of the deforming forces. In other words, erythrocytes behave like elastic bodies, while they also resist to shape change under deforming forces. This viscoelastic behavior of erythrocytes is determined by the following three properties: 1) Geometry of erythrocytes; the biconcave-discoid shape provides an extra surface area for the cell, enabling shape change without increasing surface area. This type of shape change requires significantly smaller forces than those required for shape change with surface area expansion. 2) Cytoplasmic viscosity; reflecting the cytoplasmic hemoglobin concentration of erythrocytes. 3) Visco-elastic properties of erythrocyte membrane, mainly determined by the special membrane skeletal network of erythrocytes.

== Physiological significance ==
Erythrocyte deformability is an important determinant of blood viscosity, hence blood flow resistance in the vascular system. It affects blood flow in large blood vessels, due to the increased frictional resistance between fluid laminae under laminar flow conditions. It also affects the microcirculatory blood flow significantly, where erythrocytes are forced to pass through blood vessels with diameters smaller than their size.

== Clinical significance ==
Erythrocyte deformability is altered under various pathophysiological conditions. Sickle-cell disease is characterized by extensive impairment in erythrocyte deformability, being dependent on the oxygen partial pressure. Erythrocyte deformability has also been demonstrated to be impaired in diabetes, peripheral vascular diseases, sepsis and a variety of other diseases. The property offers broad utility in disease diagnosis (also see Measurement, below).

Stored packed red blood cells (sometimes denoted "pRBC" or "StRBC") also experience changes in membrane properties like deformability during storage and related processing, as part of a broader phenomenon known as "storage lesion." While the clinical implications are still being explored, deformability can be indicative of quality or preservation thereof for stored RBC product available for blood transfusion. Perfusion (or perfusability) is a deformability-based metric that may offer a particularly physiologically-relevant representation of storage-induced deterioration of RBC occurring in blood banks, and the associated impacts of storage conditions/systems.

== Measurement ==
Erythocyte deformability is a measurable property, and various means for its measurement have been explored - with each having results and significance being highly particularized to the given approach employed. Accordingly, the term is somewhat loose in the sense that a given cell or sample of cells may be deemed significantly more "deformable" by one means/metric relative to another means/metric. Thus for meaningful "apples-to-apples" comparisons involving cell deformability, it is important to utilize the same qualitative approach.

Ektacytometry based on laser diffraction analysis is a commonly preferred (and a fairly direct) method for measuring deformability. Another direct metric is optical tweezers, which targets individual cells. Deformability can in effect be measured indirectly, such as by how much pressure and/or time it takes cells pass through pores of a filter (i.e., filterability or filtration) or perfuse through capillaries (perfusion), in vitro or in vivo, having smaller diameters than the cells'. Some deformability tests may be more physiologically-relevant than others for given applications. For example, perfusion is more sensitive to relatively small changes in deformability (compared to filterability), thus making it preferable for assessing RBC deformability in contexts where microcirculatory implications are of particular interest. Moreover, some tests may track how deformability itself changes as conditions change and/or as deformation is repeated.

== Related erythrocyte properties ==
Erythrocytes/RBC may also be tested for other (related) membrane properties, including erythrocyte fragility (osmotic or mechanical) and cell morphology. Morphology can be measured by indexes which characterize shape changes of differences among cells. Fragility testing involves subjecting a sample of cells to osmotic and/or mechanical stress(es), then ascertaining how much hemolysis results thereafter, and then characterizing susceptibility to or propensity for stress-induced hemolysis with an index or profile (which can be useful to assess cells' ability to withstand sustained or repeated stresses).

Other related red blood cell properties can include adhesion and aggregation, which along with deformability are often classed as RBC "flow properties."
