= Imaging particle analysis =

Microscopy technique

Imaging particle analysis is a technique for making particle measurements using digital imaging, one of the techniques defined by the broader term particle size analysis. The measurements that can be made include particle size, particle shape (morphology or shape analysis and grayscale or color, as well as distributions (graphs) of statistical population measurements.

== Description and history ==
Imaging particle analysis uses the techniques common to image analysis or image processing for the analysis of particles. Particles are defined here per particle size analysis as particulate solids, and thereby not including atomic or sub-atomic particles. Furthermore, this article is limited to real images (optically formed), as opposed to "synthetic" (computed) images (computed tomography, confocal microscopy, SIM and other super resolution microscopy techniques, etc.).

Given the above, the primary method for imaging particle analysis is using optical microscopy. While optical microscopes have been around and used for particle analysis since the 1600s, the "analysis" in the past has been accomplished by humans using the human visual system. As such, much of this analysis is subjective, or qualitative in nature. Even when some sort of qualitative tools are available, such as a measuring reticle in the microscope, it has still required a human to determine and record those measurements.

Beginning in the late 1800s with the availability of photographic plates, it became possible to capture microscope images permanently on film or paper, making measurements easier to acquire by simply using a scaled ruler on the hard copy image. While this significantly speeded up the acquisition of particle measurements, it was still a tedious, labor-intensive process, which not only made it difficult to measure statistically significant particle populations, but also still introduced some degree of human error to the process.

Finally, beginning roughly in the late 1970s, CCD digital sensors for capturing images and computers which could process those images, began to revolutionize the process by using digital imaging. Although the actual algorithms for performing digital image processing had been around for some time, it was not until the significant computing power needed to perform these analyses became available at reasonable prices that digital imaging techniques could be brought to bear in the mainstream. The first dynamic imaging particle analysis system was patented in 1982. As faster computing resources became available at lowered costs, the task of making measurements from microscope images of particles could now be performed automatically by machine without human intervention, making it possible to measure significantly larger numbers of particles in much less time.

== Image acquisition methods ==
The basic process by which imaging particle analysis is carried out is as follows:

1. A digital camera captures an image of the field of view in the optical system.
2. A gray scale thresholding process is used to perform image segmentation, segregating out the particles from the background, creating a binary image of each particle.
3. Digital image processing techniques are used to perform image analysis operations, resulting in morphological and grey-scale measurements to be stored for each particle.
4. The measurements saved for each particle are then used to generate image population statistics, or as inputs to algorithms for filtering and sorting the particles into groups of similar types. In some systems, sophisticated pattern recognition techniques may also be employed in order to separate different particle types contained in a heterogeneous sample.

Imaging particle analyzers can be subdivided into two distinct types, static and dynamic, based upon the image acquisition methods. While the basic principles are the same, the methods of image acquisition are different in nature, and each has advantages and disadvantages.

=== Static imaging particle analysis ===
Static image acquisition is the most common form. Almost all microscopes can be easily adapted to accept a digital camera via a C mount adaptor. This type of set-up is often referred to as a digital microscope, although many systems using that name are used only for displaying an image on a monitor.

The sample is prepared on a microscope slide which is placed on the microscope stage. Once the sample has been focused on, then an image can be acquired and displayed on the monitor. If it is a digital camera or a frame grabber is present, the image can now be saved in digital format, and image processing algorithms can be used to isolate particles in the field of view and measure them.

In static image acquisition only one field of view image is captured at a time. If the user wishes to image other portions of the same sample on the slide, they can use the X-Y positioning hardware (typically composed of two linear stages on the microscope to move to a different area of the slide. Care must be taken to ensure that two images do not overlap so as not to count and measure the same particles more than once.

The major drawback to static image acquisition is that it is time consuming, both in sample preparation (getting the sample onto the slide with proper dilution if necessary), and in multiple movements of the stage in order to be able to acquire a statistically significant number of particles to count/measure. Computer-controlled X-Y positioning stages are sometimes used in these systems to speed the process up and to reduce the amount of operator intervention, but it is still a time consuming process, and the motorized stages can be expensive due to the level of precision required when working at high magnification.

The major advantages to static particle imaging systems are the use of standard microscope systems and simplicity of depth of field considerations. Since these systems can be made from any standard optical microscope, they may be a lower cost approach for people who already have microscopes. More important, though, is that microscope-based systems have less depth of field issues generally versus dynamic imaging systems. This is because the sample is placed on a microscope slide, and then usually covered with a cover slip, thus limiting the plane containing the particles relative to the optical axis. This means that more particles will be in acceptable focus at high magnifications.

=== Dynamic imaging particle analysis ===
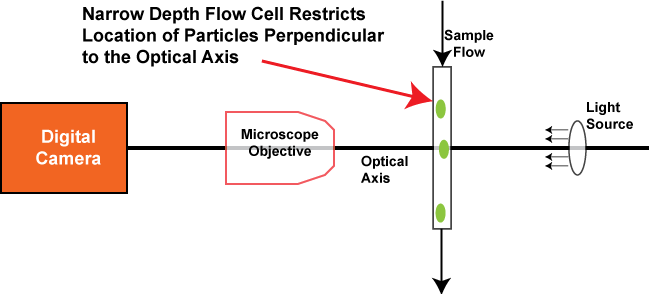
Diagram showing flow-through architecture for dynamic imaging particle analysis.

In Dynamic image acquisition, large amounts of sample are imaged by moving the sample past the microscope optics and using high speed flash illumination to effectively "freeze" the motion of the sample. The flash is synchronized with a high shutter speed in the camera to further prevent motion blur. In a dry particle system, the particles are dispensed from a shaker table and fall by gravity past the optical system. In fluid imaging particle analysis systems, the liquid is passed across the optical axis by use of a narrow flow cell as shown at right.

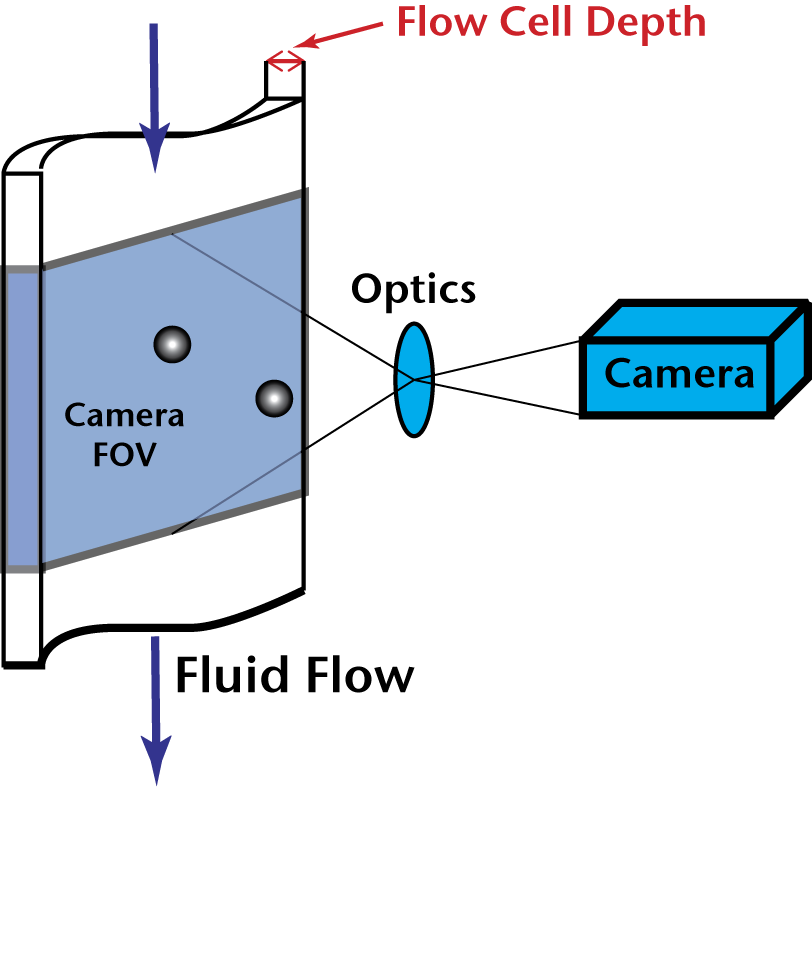
Diagram showing the flow cell cross-section perpendicular to the optical axis in a dynamic imaging particle analyzer. Credit: Fluid Imaging Technologies, Inc.

The flow cell is characterized by its depth perpendicular to the optical axis, as shown in the second diagram on right. In order to keep the particles in focus, the flow depth is restricted so that the particles remain in a plane of best focus perpendicular to the optical axis. This is similar in concept to the effect of the microscope slide plus cover slip in a static imaging system. Since depth of field decreases exponentially with increasing magnification, the depth of the flow cell must be narrowed significantly with higher magnifications.

The major drawback to dynamic image acquisition is that the flow cell depth must be limited as described above. This means that, in general, particles larger in size than the flow cell depth can not be allowed in the sample being processed, because they will probably clog the system. So the sample will typically have to be filtered to remove particles larger than the flow cell depth prior to being evaluated. If it is desired to look at a very wide range of particle size, this may mean that the sample would have to be fractionated into smaller size range components, and run with different magnification/flow cell combinations.

The major advantage to dynamic image acquisition is that it enables acquiring and measuring particles at significantly higher speed, typically on the order of 10,000 particles/minute or greater. This means that statistically significant populations can be analyzed in far shorter time periods than previously possible with manual microscopy or even static imaging particle analysis. In this sense, dynamic imaging particle analysis systems combine the speed typical of particle counters with the discriminatory capabilities of microscopy.

Dynamic imaging particle analysis is used in aquatic microorganism research to analyze phytoplankton, zooplankton, and other aquatic microorganisms ranging from 2 um to 5 mm in size. Dynamic imaging particle analysis is also biopharmaceutical research to characterize and analyze particles ranging from 300 nm to 5mm in size.

=== Micro-flow imaging ===
Micro-flow imaging (MFI) is a particle analysis technique that uses flow microscopy to quantify particles contained in a solution based on size. This technique is used in the biopharmaceutical industry to characterize subvisible particles from approximately 1 μm to >50 μm.
