= Erythrocyte fragility =

Medical diagnosis

- MeSH: D009996

Erythrocyte fragility refers to the propensity of erythrocytes (red blood cells, RBC) to hemolyse (rupture) under stress. It can be thought of as the degree or proportion of hemolysis that occurs when a sample of red blood cells are subjected to stress (typically physical stress, and most commonly osmotic and/or mechanical stress). Depending on the application as well as the kind of fragility involved, the amount of stress applied and/or the significance of the resultant hemolysis may vary.

When multiple levels of stress are applied to a given population/sample of cells, a fragility profile can be obtained by measuring the relative or absolute extent of hemolysis existing at each such level, in addition to finding one or more single-number indexes (either measured directly or interpolated) associated with particular respective levels of hemolysis and/or corresponding stress. Fragility testing can be useful to assess cells' ability (or lack thereof) to withstand sustained or repeated stress. Moreover, it can be used to assess how fragility itself varies under different or changing environmental or stress conditions, during or prior to the inducement of the hemolysis. Low fragility is often termed "stability," though technically stability refers to cells' resistance to both stress-induced lysis and spontaneous auto-lysis.

== Erythrocyte osmotic fragility ==
Osmotic fragility (OF) refers to the degree or proportion of hemolysis that occurs when a sample of red blood cells are subjected to osmotic stress by being placed in a hypotonic solution. Osmotic fragility is affected by various factors, including membrane composition and integrity as well as the cells' sizes or surface-area-to-volume ratios.

The osmotic fragility test is common in hematology, and is often performed to aid with diagnosis of diseases associated with RBC membrane abnormalities. Some diseases linked to increased OF include hereditary spherocytosis and hypernatremia, while some linked to decreased OF include chronic liver disease, iron deficiency anemia, thalassemia, hyponatremia, polycythemia vera, hereditary xerocytosis, and sickle cell anemia after splenectomy.

New approaches to testing OF are under development to better facilitate its use in disease diagnosis and screening, such as by utilizing microfluidic devices along with cell counting.

== Erythrocyte mechanical fragility ==
Mechanical fragility (MF) refers to the degree or proportion of hemolysis that occurs when a sample of red blood cells are subjected to mechanical stress, such as (typically) some kind of shear stress. Yet unlike with osmotic fragility, no single approach for testing mechanical fragility has yet gained sufficient acceptance to enable standardization. This has led to some insurance companies not currently covering the test.

Uses of erythrocyte mechanical fragility can include diagnostic testing, calibrations to aid comparisons of hemolysis caused by blood-handling devices, or assessment of sublethal (i.e., non-hemolysing) damage caused to cells from devices that manipulate blood (such as for dialysis or intraoperative autotransfusion). It can also help in assessing damage of stored RBC product (so-called "storage lesion"), leading to applications in blood transfusion and blood banking.

It's also notable that there can be a qualitative difference between a mechanical fragility test involving a comparatively lower energy stress, such as by agitating one or more beads in the presence of the sample (a common approach), versus a higher energy stress, such as by applying ultrasound to the sample. The difference is that the lower-energy category of stress can more prominently reflect cell membrane properties, whereas the higher-energy category largely reflects other properties like hemoglobin viscosity and cell size. Viscous or fluidic-mechanical stresses can be of either sort.

Mechanical fragility is increased in the cases of sickle cell anemia, thalassemia, hereditary spherocytosis etc. .

== Related erythrocyte properties ==
Susceptibility to hemolysis from causes other than osmotic or mechanical forces are not as common, but may sometimes be referred to in terms of fragility or stability. For example, photons or radicals can induce hemolysis.Erythrocytes/RBC may also be tested for related membrane properties aside from fragility, including erythrocyte deformability and cell morphology. Morphology can be measured by indexes which characterize shape changes of differences among cells. Deformability testing involves measuring the degree or ease of cells' contortion or shape change under a given level of applied force - or some indirect inference of the like. Other related red blood cell properties can include adhesion and aggregation, which along with deformability are often classed as RBC "flow properties."
