= Soil texture =

Property of a soil

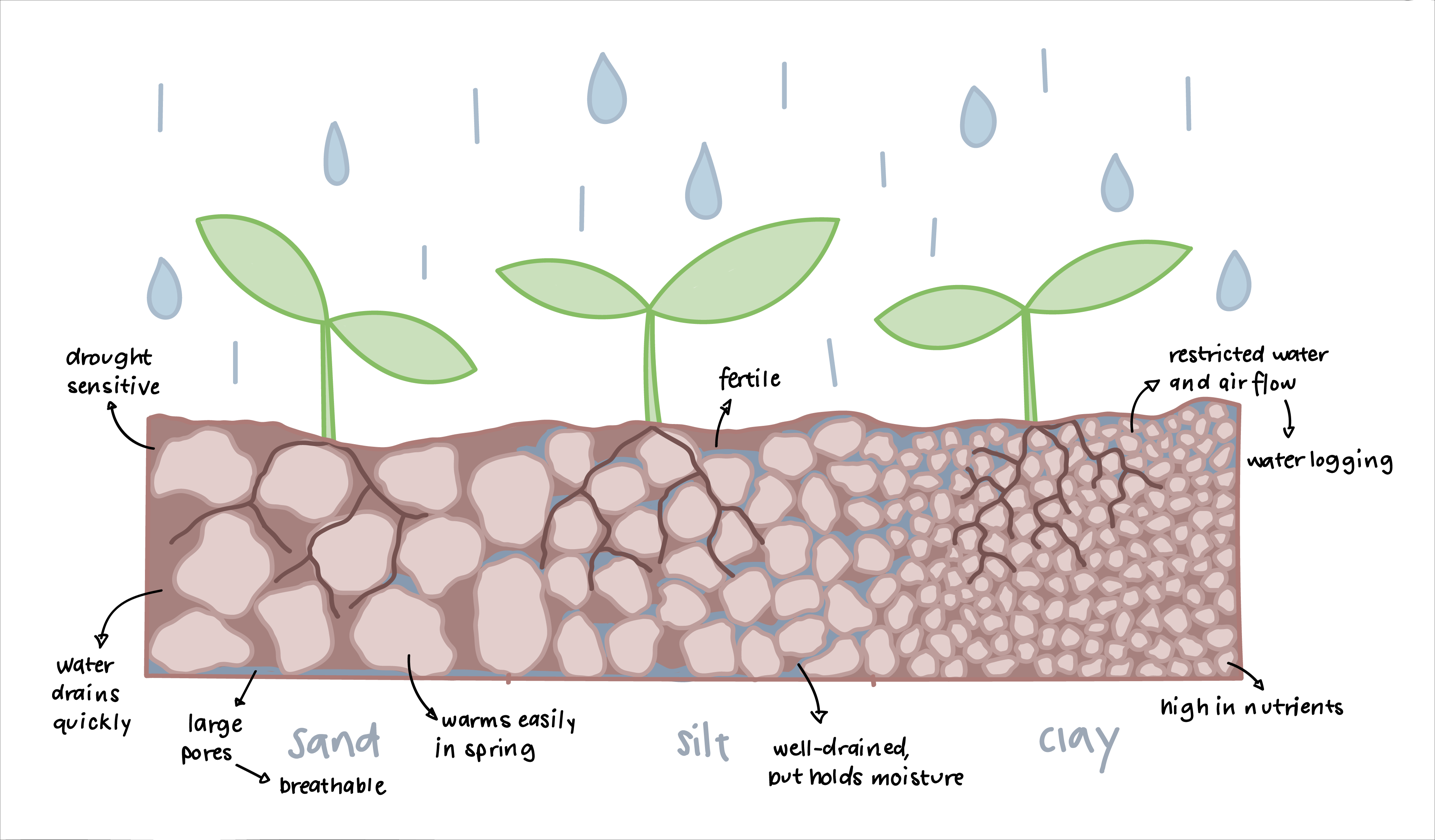
soil texture

Soil texture is the identifying quality of the upper layer of earth, which is composed of sand, silt and clay. Soil texture can be determined using qualitative methods such as texture by feel, and quantitative methods such as the hydrometer method based on Stokes' law. Soil texture has agricultural applications such as determining crop suitability and to predict the response of the soil to environmental and management conditions such as drought or calcium (lime) requirements. Soil texture focuses on the particles that are less than two millimeters in diameter which include sand, silt, and clay. The USDA soil taxonomy and WRB soil classification systems use 12 textural classes whereas the UK-ADAS system uses 11. These classifications are based on the percentages of sand, silt, and clay in the soil.

== History ==
The first classification, the international system, was first proposed by Albert Atterberg in 1905 and was based on his studies in southern Sweden. Atterberg chose 20 μm for the upper limit of silt fraction because particles smaller than that size were not visible to the naked eye, the suspension could be coagulated by salts, capillary rise within 24 hours was most rapid in this fraction, and the pores between compacted particles were so small as to prevent the entry of root hairs. Commission One of the International Society of Soil Science (ISSS) recommended its use at the First International Congress of Soil Science held in Washington in 1927. Australia adopted this system, and its equal logarithmic intervals are an attractive feature worth maintaining. The United States Department of Agriculture (USDA) adopted its own system in 1938, and the Food and Agriculture Organization (FAO) used the USDA system in the FAO-UNESCO world soil map and recommended its use.

== Classification ==
Soil texture triangle, showing the 12 major textural classes, and particle size scales as defined by the USDA

In the United States, twelve major soil texture classifications are defined by the United States Department of Agriculture. The twelve classifications are sand, loamy sand, sandy loam, loam, silt loam, silt, sandy clay loam, clay loam, silty clay loam, sandy clay, silty clay, and clay. Soil textures are classified by the fractions of each soil separate (sand, silt, and clay) present in a soil. Classifications are typically named for the primary constituent particle size or a combination of the most abundant particles sizes, e.g. "sandy clay" or "silty clay". A fourth term, loam, is used to describe equal properties of sand, silt, and clay in a soil sample, and lends to the naming of even more classifications, e.g. "clay loam" or "silt loam".

Determining soil texture is often aided with the use of a soil texture triangle plot. An example of a soil textural triangle is found on the right side of the page. One side of the triangle represents percent sand, the second side represents percent clay, and the third side represents percent silt. If the percentages of sand, clay, and silt in the soil sample are known, then the triangle can be used to classify the soil texture. For example, if a soil is 70 percent sand and 10 percent clay then the soil is classified as a sandy loam. The same method can be used starting on any side of the soil triangle. If the texture by feel method was used to determine the soil type, the triangle can also provide a rough estimate on the percentages of sand, silt, and clay in the soil.

Chemical and physical properties of a soil are related to texture. Particle size and distribution will affect a soil's capacity for holding water and nutrients. Fine textured soils generally have a higher capacity for water retention, whereas sandy soils contain large pore spaces that allow leaching.

== Soil separates ==
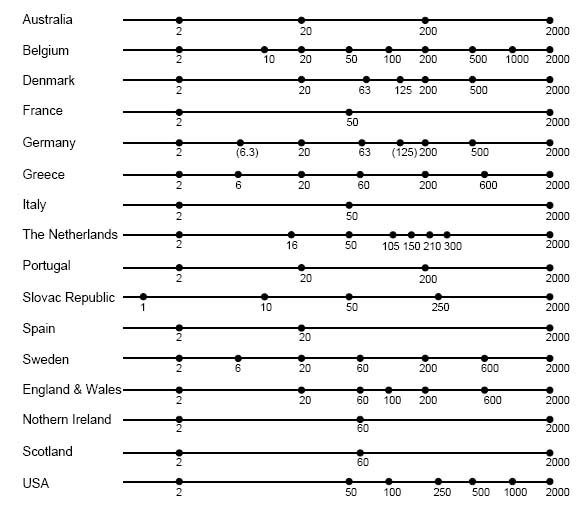
Particle size classifications used by different countries, diameters in μm

Soil separates are specific ranges of particle sizes. The smallest particles are clay particles and are classified as having diameters of less than 0.002 mm. Clay particles are plate-shaped instead of spherical, allowing for an increased specific surface area. The next smallest particles are silt particles and have diameters between 0.002 mm and 0.05 mm (in USDA Soil Taxonomy). The largest particles are sand particles and are larger than 0.05 mm in diameter. Furthermore, large sand particles can be described as coarse, intermediate as medium, and the smaller as fine. Other countries have their own particle size classifications.

Name of soil separate	Diameter limits (mm) (USDA classification)	Diameter limits (mm) (WRB classification)
Clay	less than 0.002	less than 0.002
Silt	0.002 – 0.05	0.002 – 0.063
Very fine sand	0.05 – 0.10	0.063 – 0.125
Fine sand	0.10 – 0.25	0.125 – 0.20
Medium sand	0.25 – 0.50	0.20 – 0.63
Coarse sand	0.50 – 1.00	0.63 – 1.25
Very coarse sand	1.00 – 2.00	1.25 – 2.00

== Methodology ==
=== Texture by feel ===
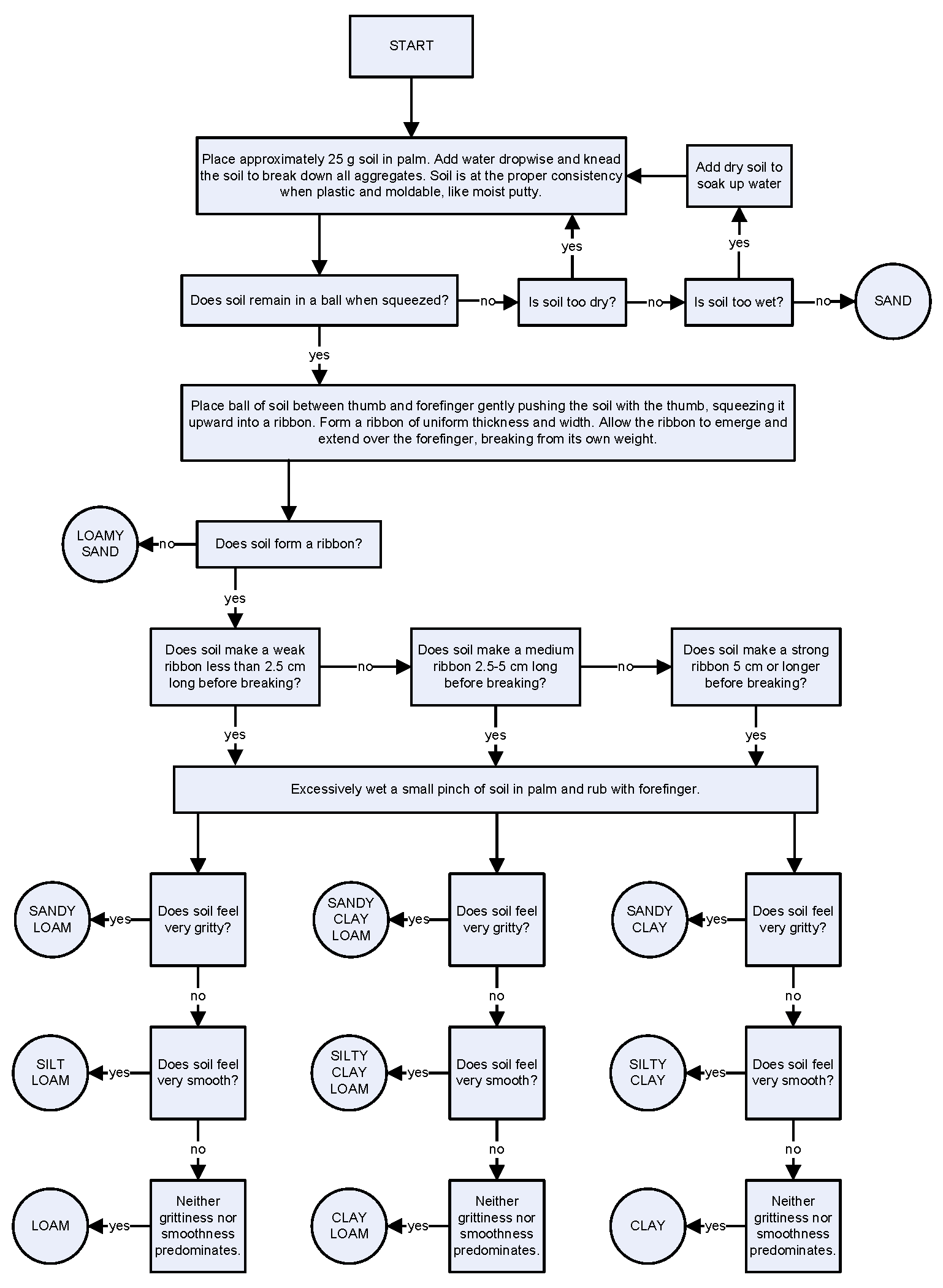
Texture by feel flow chart

Hand analysis is a simple and effective means to rapidly assess and classify a soil's physical condition. Correctly executed, the procedure allows for rapid and frequent assessment of soil characteristics with little or no equipment. It is thus a useful tool for identifying spatial variation both within and between fields as well as identifying progressive changes and boundaries between soil map units (soil series). Texture by feel is a qualitative method, as it does not provide exact values of sand, silt, and clay. Although qualitative, the texture by feel flowchart can be an accurate way for a scientist or interested (and trained) individual to analyze the relative proportions of sand, silt, and clay.

The texture by feel method involves taking a small sample of soil and making a ribbon. A ribbon can be made by taking a ball of soil and pushing the soil between the thumb and forefinger and squeezing it upward into a ribbon. Allow the ribbon to emerge and extend over the forefinger, breaking from its own weight. Measuring the unbroken length of the ribbon can help determine the amount of clay in the sample. After making a ribbon, excessively wet a small pinch of soil in the palm of the hand and rub in with the forefinger to determine the amount of sand in the sample. Soils that have a high percentage of sand, such as sandy loam or sandy clay, have a gritty texture. Soils that have a high percentage of silt, such as silty loam or silty clay, feel smooth. Soils that have a high percentage of clay, such as clay loam, have a sticky feel. Although the texture by feel method takes practice, it is a useful way to determine soil texture, especially in the field.

The international soil classification system World Reference Base for Soil Resources (WRB) uses an alternative method to determine texture by feel, offering another flow chart.

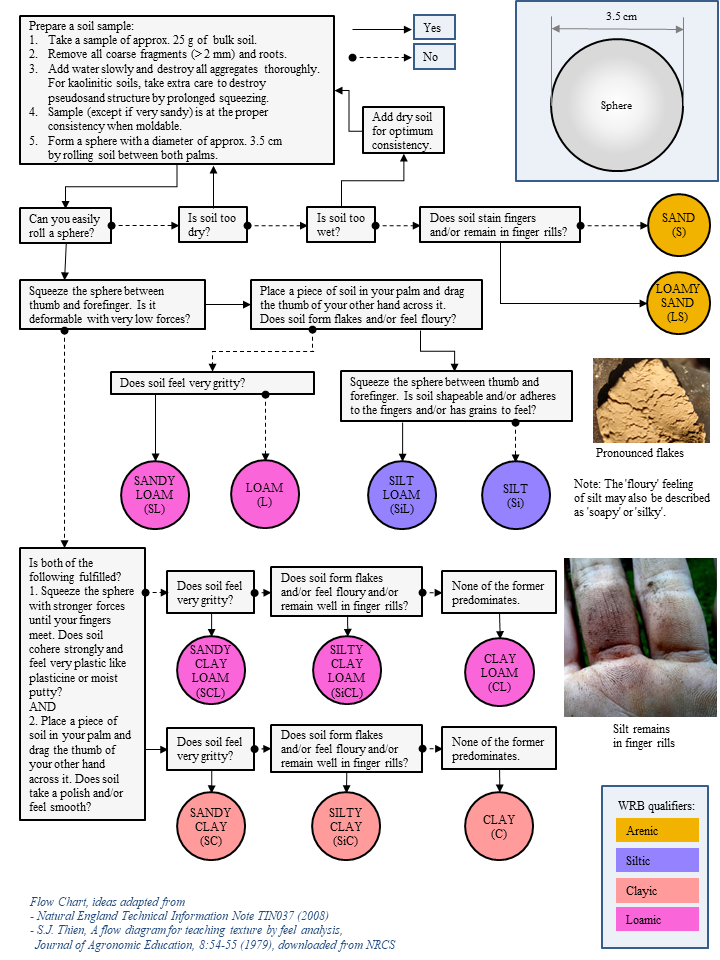
Flow Chart to determine soil texture as used by the 4th edition of the WRB

=== Sieving ===
Sieving is a long-established but still widely used soil analysis technique. In sieving, a known weight of sample material passes through finer and finer sieves. The amount collected on each sieve is weighed to determine the percentage weight in each size fraction.

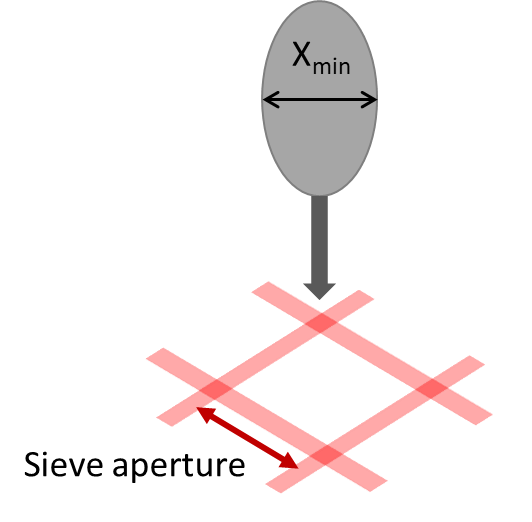
Schematic representation of sieve method

The method is used to determine the grain size distribution of soils that are greater than 75 μm in diameter, as sieving has a strong disadvantage in the lower measurement border. In fact, in case of finer fraction at high content of clay and silt (below 60 μm), the dispersion becomes challenging because of the high cohesiveness of particles, stickiness of powder to the sieve, and electrostatic charges. Moreover, in the sieving particles pass with the smallest side through the mesh opening, which means that the plate-shaped clay and silt particles might be sieved as well. In all this generally leads to a massive underestimation of the fine fraction.

In order to measure silt and clay (with a particle size below 60 μm), a second, independent sizing method (most often hydrometer or pipette technique) is used on the sample taken from the bottom sieve. Particle size distribution obtained from sieve analysis should be combined with the data from a sedimentation analysis to establish a complete particle size distribution of the sample.

=== Hydrometer method ===
The particle size distribution of soil containing a significant number of finer particles (silt and clay) cannot be performed by sieve analysis solely, therefore sedimentation analysis is used to determine the lower range of the particle size distribution. Sedimentation analysis (e.g. pipette method, hydrometer) is commonly used in soil engineering or in geology to classify sediments. The hydrometer method, introduced in 1927, is still widely used today. However, problems with the empirical 1927 protocol have been identified[30],[31] and the original procedure and type of settling cylinder should not be used. Day[30] described the effective settling depth as the horizontal plane, at which the density of the suspension is equal to the (blank-adjusted) reading on the stem of the floating hydrometer.

The hydrometer method of determining soil texture is a quantitative measurement providing estimates of the percent sand, clay, and silt in the soil based on Stokes' law, which expresses the relationship between the settling velocity and particle size.

According to this law the particles settle down because of the weight and gravity action. However, there are two additional forces acting in the opposite direction of a particle's motion which determines the equilibrium condition at which the particle falls at a constant velocity called terminal velocity.

The hydrometer method requires the use of sodium hexametaphosphate, which acts as a dispersing agent to separate soil aggregates. The soil is mixed with the sodium hexametaphosphate solution on an orbital shaker overnight. The solution is transferred to one liter graduated cylinders and filled with water. The soil solution is vigorously mixed with a metal plunger to disperse the soil particles. A timer is started immediately after mixing. The soil particles separate based on size and sink to the bottom. Sand particles (> 50 microns) sink to the bottom of the cylinder first. Silt particles sink to the bottom of the cylinder after the sand. Clay particles (2 microns or finer) separate out above the silt layer.

Measurements are taken using a hydrometer, (type ASTM 152H) which measures grams of dissolved and suspended material per liter of suspension. The hydrometer is lowered into the cylinder containing the soil mixture and a reading made at two different times following mixing; after forty seconds to measure grams per liter of suspended silt and clay (hence giving sand content), and 6-8 hours (depending on settling cylinder dimensions and concentration of the dispersing agent used) to measure grams / L of clay still remaining above the effective settling depth. The 40s reading is still empirical because some particles are moving upwards at time zero. A blank reading (made in a solution of dispersing agent kept at the same temperature as the soil suspension) is subtracted from each suspension reading, thus avoiding any need for temperature correction.[31] The calculations are as follows:

Percent sand = 100 – (blank-adjusted 40s hydrometer reading) x 100 / (dry weight of soil used)

Percent clay = (blank-adjusted later reading) x 100 / (dry weight of soil used)

Percent silt = 100 – (percent clay + percent sand)

The Stokes' diameter determined via sedimentation method is the diameter of a sphere having the same settling velocity and same density as the particle. This is the reason why the sedimentation analysis applies well when assuming that particles are spherical, have similar densities, have negligible interactions and are small enough to ensure that the fluid flow stays laminar. Deviations from Stokes' equation are to be expected in case of irregularly shaped particles, such as clay particles which are mostly platy or tubular. The stable position during settling of particles with such shapes is with the maximum cross-sectional area being perpendicular to the direction of motion. For this reason, the drag resistance of particles increases and the settling velocity decreases. The particle diameter is directly proportional to the settling velocity. Therefore, with lower velocity, the calculated diameter also decreases determining an overestimation of the fine size fraction.

Sedimentation analysis shows limits for particles smaller than 0.2 micron because such small particles undergo Brownian motion in the suspension and do not settle according to Stokes' law.

=== Laser Diffraction ===
Laser diffraction is a measurement technique for determining the particle size distribution of samples, either dispersed in a liquid or as a dry powder. The technique is based on light waves getting bent when encountering particles in a sample. The measured equivalent spherical diameter is the diameter of a sphere having on the cross-sectional area the same diffraction pattern as the investigated particle.

The angle of diffraction depends on the particle size, hence the pattern of diffraction depends on the relative amounts of different particle sizes present in that sample. This diffraction pattern is then detected and analyzed by means of Mie and Fraunhofer diffraction models. The outcome of the measurement is a particle size distribution (PSD).

By means of laser diffraction not only the particle size distribution and the corresponding volume weighted D-values can be determined but also the percentage of particles in the main classical size classes currently used for the soil classification.

Compared to other techniques laser diffraction is a fast and cost-effective method to measure particle size and quickly analyze soil samples, even very small samples as those used in forensic science. A big advantage is the built-in dispersion (e.g. dispersion by air pressure or ultrasound dispersion) unit of laser diffraction instruments. Therefore, dry samples can be measured without external sample preparation steps, which are required for sieving and sedimentation analysis. Moreover, since the sample can be dispersed properly, there is no need to combine two different measurement techniques to obtain the full range of the particle size distribution, including the silt and clay content.

Both Fraunhofer and Mie laser diffraction theories assume that particles are spherically shaped. This results in a small measurement error, since small particles in soil samples, such as clay and silt in particular, are elongated and anisotropic. The particle diameter in the laser diffraction method is determined in relation to their potential volume, which is calculated on the basis of an optical diffraction image at the edges of the particle cross-section. The volume of clay particles is the diameter of the plate’s cross-section, which is treated in the calculations as the diameter of the (virtual) sphere. Therefore, their dimensions are usually overestimated in comparison to those measured via sedimentation analysis.

The error associated with the assumption of the sphericity of particles depends furthermore on the degree of anisotropy. The optical properties of anisotropic particles, such as refractive index and absorption index, change according to their orientation relative to the laser beam which is also variable. Therefore, at different particles orientations different cross-sections will be measured and different diffraction patterns produced.

For clays with sizes close to the wavelength of a laser beam, Mie theory would be desirable. This requires precise knowledge of the complex refractive index of the particles’ material, including their absorption coefficient. Because these parameters are often difficult to retrieve, especially the light absorption coefficients for various particles and soil grains, Fraunhofer theory, which only takes into account the light diffraction phenomena at the edge of the particles, is often recommended for natural soils.

=== Additional methods ===
There are several additional quantitative methods to determine soil texture. Some examples of these methods are the pipette method, the X-ray sedimentation, the particulate organic matter (POM) method, the rapid method.

==== X-ray sedimentation ====
The X-ray sedimentation technique is a hybrid technique which combines sedimentation and X-ray absorption. The particle size is calculated from the terminal settling velocities of particles by applying Stokes' law. The absorption of the X-radiation is used to determine the relative mass concentration for each size class by applying the Beer-Lambert-Bouguer law.

== See also ==
- Soil color
- Texture (geology)
- Hydrometer
- USDA soil taxonomy
