= Single particle extinction and scattering =

Physics technique

Single Particle Extinction and Scattering (SPES) is a technique in physics that is used to characterise micro and nanoparticles suspended in a fluid through two independent parameters, the diameter and the effective refractive index.

A laser generates a gaussian beam which focuses inside a flow cell. A particle that passes through the focal region generates an interference in the beam, which is collected with a sensor. Through this signal it is possible to derive the real part and the imaginary part of the forward scattering field from each particle.

The technique was developed to measure aerosols in air and particles in liquid.
