= Interferometric scattering microscopy =

Microscopy methods

Typical iSCAT configurations where either the reflected light from the cover-slip (a, c) or the transmitted light through the sample (b, d) is used as a reference field. The signal can be acquired with a camera in wide-field operation (a, b) or by point detection in confocal arrangement (c, d).

Interferometric scattering microscopy (iSCAT) refers to a class of methods that detect and image a subwavelength object by interfering the light scattered by it with a reference light field. The underlying physics is shared by other conventional interferometric methods such as phase contrast or differential interference contrast, or reflection interference microscopy. The key feature of iSCAT is the detection of elastic scattering from subwavelength particles, also known as Rayleigh scattering, in addition to reflected or transmission signals from supra-wavelength objects. Typically, the challenge is the detection of tiny signals on top of large and complex, speckle-like backgrounds. iSCAT has been used to investigate nanoparticles such as viruses, proteins, lipid vesicles, DNA, exosomes, metal nanoparticles, semiconductor quantum dots, charge carriers and single organic molecules without the need for a fluorescent label.

== Historical background ==
The principle of interference plays a central role in many imaging methods, including bright-field imaging because it can be described as the interference between the illumination field and the one that has interacted with the object, i.e. through extinction. In fact, even microscopy based on the interference with an external light field is more than one hundred years old.

The first iSCAT-type of measurements were performed in the biophysics community in the 1990s. A systematic development of the method for the detection of nano-objects started in the early 2000s as a general effort to explore fluorescence-free options for studying single molecules and nano-objects. In particular, gold nanoparticles down to a size of 5 nm were imaged via the interference of their scattered light with a reflected beam from the cover-slip supporting them. Using a supercontinuum laser additionally allowed for recording the particles' plasmon spectra. The early measurements were limited by residual speckle-like background. A new approach to background subtraction and the acronym iSCAT were introduced in 2009. Since then, a series of important works has been reported by various groups. Notably, further innovations in background and noise suppression have led to the development of new quantification methods such as mass photometry (originally introduced as iSCAMS), in which ultrasensitive and accurate interferometric detection is converted into a quantitative means for measuring the molecular mass of single biomolecules.

== Theoretical background ==
When a reference light is superposed with an object's scattered light, the intensity at the detector can be described by,

$I_{det} \propto |\overline{E_r} + \overline{E_s}|^2 = I_r + I_s + 2 E_r E_s \cos \phi$

where $\overline{E_r} = E_r e^{i \phi_r}$ and $\overline{E_s} = E_s e^{i \phi_s}$ are the complex electric fields of the reference and scattered light. The resulting terms are the intensity of the reference beam $(I_r = |\overline{E_r}|^2)$, the pure scattered light from the object $(I_s = |\overline{E_s}|^2)$, and the cross-term $(2 E_r E_s \cos \phi)$ which contains a phase $\phi = \phi_r - \phi_s$. This phase comprises a Gouy phase component from the variations of the wave vectors, a scattering phase component from the material properties of the object, and a sinusoidally modulating phase component which depends on the position of the particle.

In general, the reference beam can take a different path than the scattered light within the optical setup, as long as they are coherent and interfere on the detector. However, the technique becomes simpler and more stable if both beams share the same optical path. Therefore, the reflected light off the cover-slip or the transmitted beam through the sample is typically used as the reference. For the interference to occur, it is necessary that both light waves (scattered light and reference light) are coherent. Interestingly, a light source with a large coherence length on the order of meters or more (like in modern narrow-band laser systems) is typically not needed. In the most common iSCAT realization schemes where the reflected light of a cover-slip is used as a reference and the scattering particle is not more than a few hundreds of nanometers above the glass, even "incoherent" light, e.g. from LEDs, can be used.

== Applications ==
iSCAT has been used in multiple applications. These can be grouped roughly as:

=== Label-free imaging ===
- Microtubules
- Live-cell intracellular organelles
- Lipid nano/microdomains
- Single virus assembly
- Time-dependent iSCAT (StroboSCAT)

=== Single particle tracking ===
- Single virus tracking in vitro
- Single virus tracking during early-stage infection in cells
- Microsecond single particle tracking on a living cell membrane
- Motor protein tracking

=== Label-free single molecule detection, imaging, tracking and quantification ===
- Single molecule detection by absorption
- Single protein sensing
- Single protein tracking
- Mass photometry

=== Ion tracking ===
- Single ions entering/leaving battery cathode
