= Granulometry =

Granulometry is the measurement of the size distribution in a collection of grains.

- Granulometry (morphology), granulometry computation using the morphological opening operation
- Optical Granulometry, computation of granulometries from images, and its use in mines
- Measurement of grain sizes or particle sizes.

== See also ==
- Granulation (disambiguation)
- Granule (disambiguation)
