= Particle size (disambiguation) =

Particle size describes the size of particles.

Particle size may also refer to:

- Grain size (also called particle size), the size of soils, powders, gravel, etc.
- Particle size distribution

== See also ==
- Particle (disambiguation)
