= Particle (disambiguation) =

A particle in the physical sciences is a small localized object to which physical properties can be ascribed.

Particle may also refer to:

== Science ==
- Particle (ecology), in marine and freshwater ecology, a small object
- Colloidal particle, part of a one-phase system of two or more components where the particles are not individually visible
  - Particle, the solid or liquid particles in an aerosol
- Granular material
- Particulates, in the areas of atmospheric physics and air pollution
- Nanoparticle, an object between 1 and 100 nanometers that behaves as a whole
- Point particle, or point mass, an idealization of an object with finite mass but of zero size
- A particle of a medium in continuum mechanics, meaning an infinitesimal portion of it.
- Self-propelled particles, a concept used in statistical physics to model swarms
- Subatomic particle:
  - Elementary particle, or fundamental particle, a particle of which other particles are composed
  - Particle physics, the study of subatomic particles
  - See list of particles for more uses
- Suspended solids, in a liquid

== Arts, entertainment, and media ==
- Particle (band), a 2000 jam band from Los Angeles, California
- Particle (film), a 2012 Turkish film
- Particles (film), a 2019 French film
- "Particles" (song), a 2021 single by Jessica Simpson

== Computing ==
- Particle, a US HTML5 web app company acquired by Apple in 2012
- Particle system, in computer graphics, a technique to simulate certain fuzzy phenomena

== Other uses ==
- Grammatical particle, a function word

== See also ==
- Particulate (disambiguation)
- Particle size (disambiguation)
