= Particulate (disambiguation) =

Particulates, or atmospheric particulate matter, is microscopic solid or liquid matter suspended in the Earth's atmosphere.

Particulate, particulates or particulate matter may also refer to:

- Particulate inheritance, a pattern of inheritance in evolutionary biology
- Suspended solids, particulate matter suspended in liquid

== See also ==
- Particle
- Colloidal particle
- Granule (disambiguation)
- Micromeritics, the science and technology of small particles
- Particulate pollution
- Powder (substance)
