= De Brouckere mean diameter =

Average particle size weighted by volume

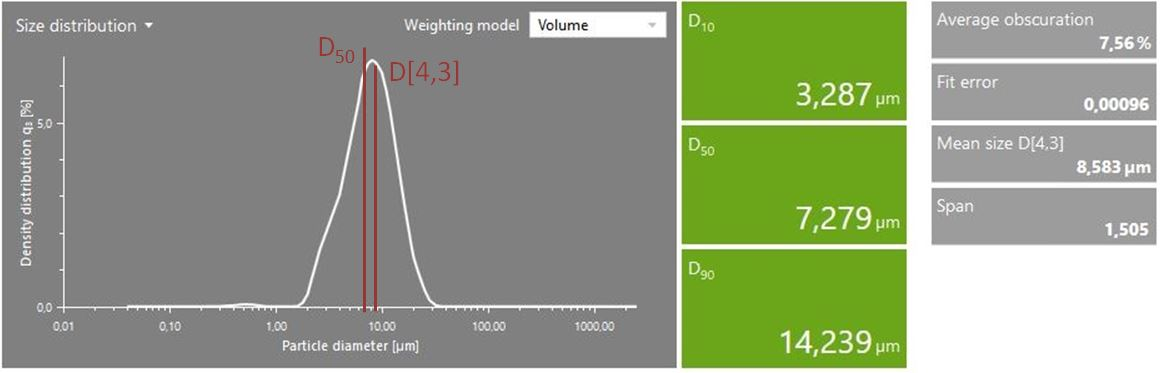
Example showing the difference between D_{50} and the De Brouckere Mean on a typical volume-weighted particle size distribution

The De Brouckere mean diameter is the mean of a particle size distribution weighted by the volume (also called volume-weighted mean diameter, volume moment mean diameter. or volume-weighted mean size). It is the mean diameter, which is directly obtained in particle size measurements, where the measured signal is proportional to the volume of the particles. The most prominent examples are laser diffraction and acoustic spectroscopy (Coulter counter).

The De Brouckere mean is defined in terms of the moment-ratio system as,

$D[4,3]= \frac{\Sigma n_iD_i^4}{\Sigma n_iD_i^3}$

Where n_{i} is the frequency of occurrence of particles in size class i, having a mean D_{i} diameter. Usually in logarithmic spaced classes, the geometric mean size of the size class is taken.

== Applications ==
The De Brouckere mean has the advantage of being more sensitive to the larger particles, which take up the largest volume of the sample, therefore giving crucial information about the product in the mining and milling industries. It was also used in combustion analysis, as the D[4,3] is less affected by the presence of very small particulate residuals, which enabled the evaluation of the primary diesel spray.

== See also ==
- Sauter mean diameter
