= Granulation (disambiguation) =

Granulation is the process of forming grains or pellets from a powdery or solid (granular) material

Granulation can also refer to:

- Granulation tissue, a product of healing in major wounds
- Granulation (jewellery), small spheres of precious metal fused to a base piece

== See also ==
- Film granularity
- Granularity
- Granularity (parallel computing)
- Granular cheese
- Granular convection
- Granular material
- Granular synthesis of sound
- Granule (disambiguation)
- Granulometry (disambiguation)
