= Cobble (geology) =

Clast of rock

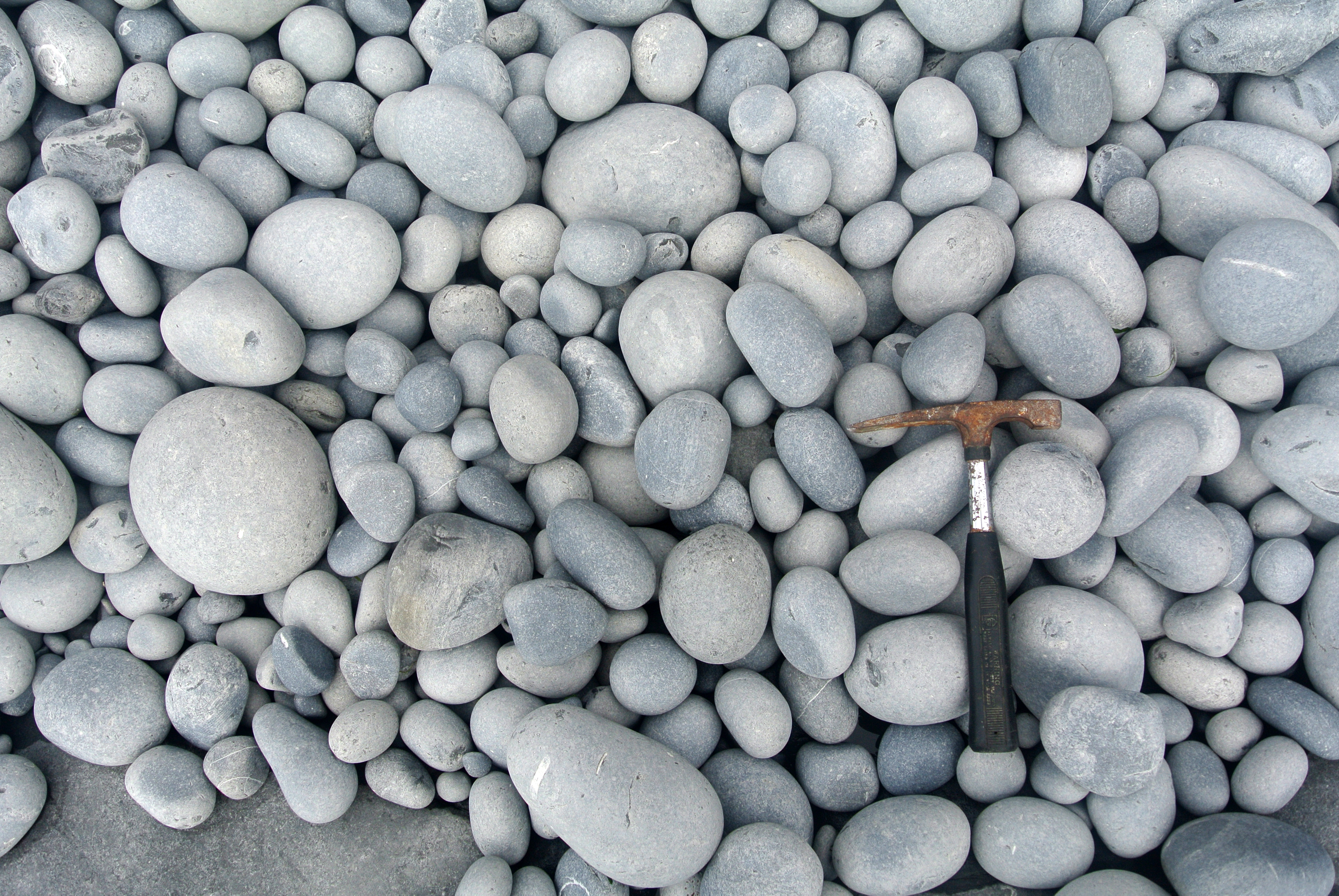
Beach cobbles (Nash Point, Wales)

A cobble (also sometimes called a cobblestone) is a clast of rock defined on the Udden–Wentworth scale as having a particle size of 64–256 millimeters (2.5–10.1 in), larger than a pebble and smaller than a boulder. Other scales define a cobble's size differently. A rock made predominantly of cobbles is termed a conglomerate. Cobblestone is a building material based on cobbles.

== Etymology ==
Cobbles, also called cobblestones, derive their name from the word cob, meaning a rounded lump. The term is further related to the German Kopf, meaning head. Chester Wentworth referred to cobbles as cobble bowlders [sic] in his 1922 paper that would become the basis for the Udden–Wentworth scale.

== Classifications ==
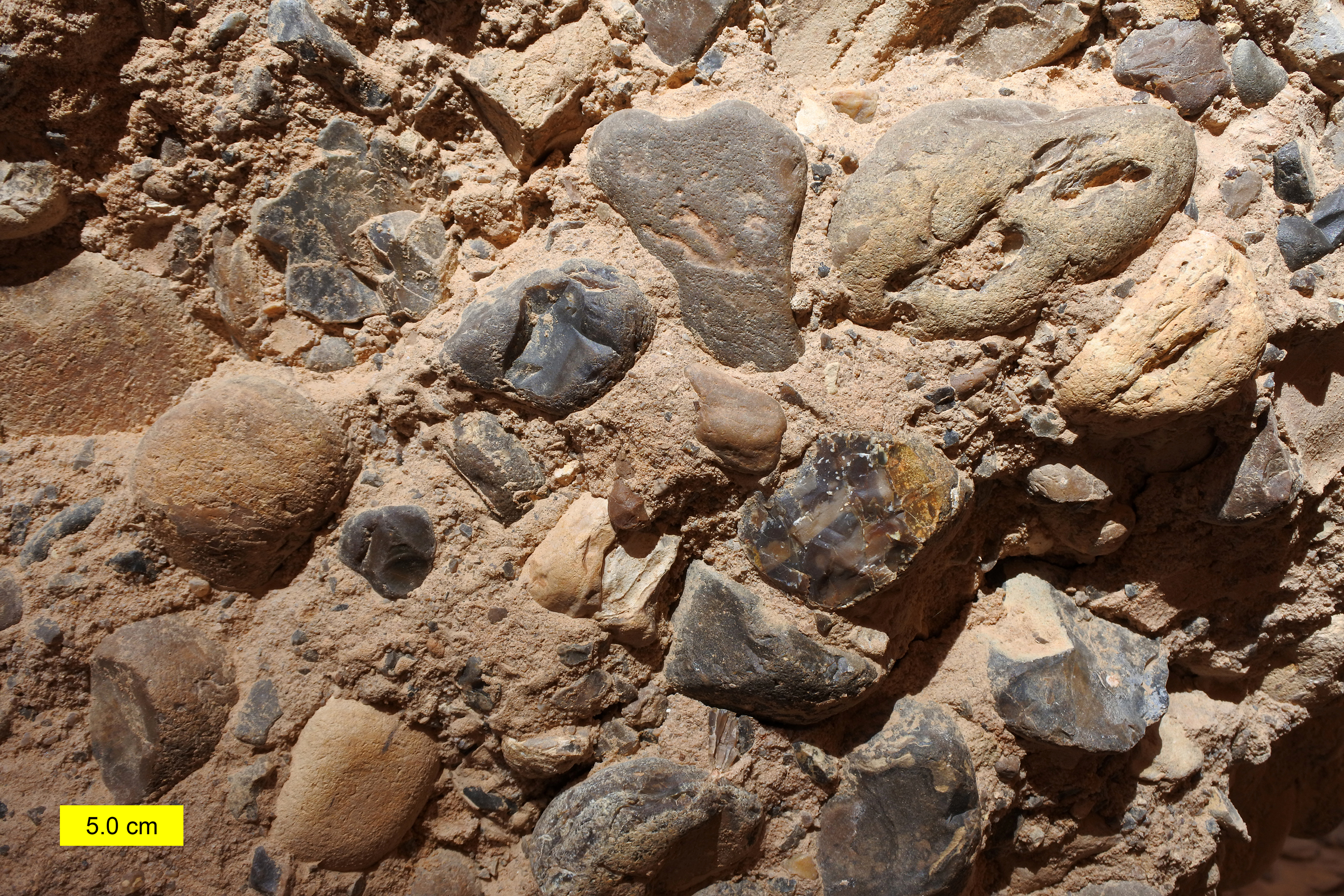
Sandy conglomerate with cobbles in the Hazeva Formation (Miocene) of southern Israel

Within the widely used Krumbein phi scale of grain sizes, cobbles are defined as clasts of rock ranging from −6 to −8 φ. This classification corresponds with the Udden–Wentworth size scale which defines cobbles as clasts with diameters from 64–256 millimeters (2.5–10.1 in). On this scale, cobbles are larger than pebbles which measure 4–64 millimeters (0.16–2.52 in) in diameter and smaller than boulders, whose diameters range from 256–4,096 millimeters (10.1–161.3 in). On the Udden–Wentworth scale, an unlithified fraction of cobbles is classified as gravel while a lithified sample primarily composed of cobbles is a conglomerate. The Committee on Sedimentation of the US National Research Council has recommended that in situ cobbles be identified by their process of origination, if possible (e.g., cobbles by disintegration, by exfoliation, etc.).

In the late 1800s and early to mid-1900s, prior to the Udden–Wentworth scale's widespread adoption, size classifications tended to group all particles larger than 2 millimeters (0.079 in) together as gravel or stones. Other scales have defined the size of a cobble slightly differently than the Udden–Wentworth; the British Standards Institution denotes a cobble as any clast ranging in diameter from 60–200 millimeters (2.4–7.9 in) while the United States Department of Agriculture's definition suggests a range of 75–250 millimeters (3.0–9.8 in) and the ISO standard 14688 names cobbles as ranging from 63–200 millimeters (2.5–7.9 in) in diameter.

Various attempts have been made to refine the Udden–Wentworth scale, including its definition of cobbles. In 1968, D. J. Doeglas proposed subdividing the cobble designation into two fractions, small cobbles (for particles with diameters from 64–125 millimeters [2.5–4.9 in]) and large cobbles (for particles with diameters from 125–250 millimeters [4.9–9.8 in]). A 1999 paper by Terence C. Blair and John G. McPherson argued that the Udden–Wentworth and Krumbein scales betrayed a historical emphasis on the study of sand grains while ignoring larger gravel grains. They proposed defining fine cobbles as those with diameters from 64–128 millimeters (2.5–5.0 in) (−6 to −7 φ) and coarse cobbles as those with diameters from 128–256 millimeters (5.0–10.1 in) (−7 to −8 φ). In 2012, Simon J. Blott and Kenneth Pye suggested that the cobble designation be eliminated altogether, replaced by very small boulder and small boulder designations equivalent in size to Blair and McPherson's fine and coarse cobbles, respectively.

== Settings ==
When occurring in streams, cobbles are likely to be found in mountain valley streambeds that are moderately steep. Cobbles are also transported by glaciers and deposited as with other grades of sediment as till. If the till is water-laid, finer particles like sand and pebbles may be entirely washed away, leaving a deposit of only boulders and cobbles. The term shingle beach refers to a beach covered with small- to medium-sized cobbles or pebbles (as opposed to fine sand). Glacially transported cobbles tend to share several identifying features including a tabular shape and downward diagonal striations on lateral facets.

Cobble conglomerates may be alluvial in origin or the product of "stone avalanches", a type of debris flow resulting from unconsolidated cobbles and gravel. In such stone avalanches, well-rounded cobbles may travel the farthest on account of their low rolling friction. When the product of alluvial processes, the cobble conglomerate's matrix consists of gravel and coarse sand. In contrast, the matrices of flow-deposited conglomerates are primarily mud.
