= Rosin-Rammler distribution =

Rosin-Rammler distribution may refer to:

- The mathematical form of the distribution, the Weibull distribution
- The application of the Rosin-Rammler distribution to particle size analysis of comminution processes
