= Granule (geology) =

Minuscule rock fragment

A granule is a clast of rock with a particle size of 2 to 4 millimetres based on the Krumbein phi scale of sedimentology. Granules are generally considered to be larger than sand (0.0625 to 2 millimetres diameter) and smaller than pebbles (4 to 64 millimetres diameter). A rock made predominantly of granules is termed a granule conglomerate.

== See also ==
- Gravel
- Particle size (grain size)
