= Dispersion Technology =

Scientific instrument manufacturer in the U.S.

Dispersion Technology Inc
- Type: Private Incorporated
- Industry: Instrumentation
- Founded: 1996
- Headquarters: Bedford Hills, New York
- Key people: Andrei Dukhin, CEO
- Website: www.dispersion.com

Dispersion Technology Inc is a scientific instrument manufacturer located in Bedford Hills, New York. It was founded in 1996 by Philip Goetz (former chairman, retired in 2010) and Dr. Andrei Dukhin (current CEO). The company develops and sells analytical instruments intended for characterizing concentrated dispersions and emulsions, complying with the International Standards for acoustic particle sizing ISO 20998 and electroacoustic zeta potential measurement ISO 13099.

Dispersion Technology manufactures a family of ultrasound-based instruments for measuring particle size, zeta potential, high frequency rheology, and solid content in concentrated systems without diluting them.

Founders Dukhin and Goetz have written two books published by Elsevier describing the details of these methods, underlying theories, and applications of the instruments manufactured by Dispersion Technology.

Co-Founder Dr. Andrei Dukhin and his father Dr. Stanislav Dukhin were the subject of a 2009 feature in the American Chemical Society documenting their research done in the former Soviet Union; their contributions to the fields of electrokinetics, colloid science, DLVO theory, etc.; and their immigration to the United States as a part of the Soviet Scientists Immigration Act of 1992.

Dispersion Technology maintains seven patents in the United States, and has representation in Japan, Russia, Europe, Brazil, South Korea, China, and Canada.

== Products ==
- Particle Size Analyzers
- Zeta Potential Analyzers
- Longitudinal Rheology Analyzers
- Aqueous Conductivity Probes
- Non-Aqueous Conductivity Probes

== Research utilizing instrumentation ==
Scientific papers have been published using instruments manufactured by Dispersion Technology to study the following kinds of systems:

- Suspensions of Solids:
  - Cement and Concrete
  - Silica
  - Metals and Metal Oxides
  - Superplasticizers
  - Pigments
  - Latexes
  - Clays
- Nano-Particles
- Emulsions (both micro and macro)
  - Oil-in-water
  - Water-in-oil
- Proteins
- Micelles
- Milling and Nanomilling
- Films
- Membranes
- Polymer Gel Systems
