= Particle-size distribution =

Function representing relative sizes of particles in a system

Granulometry
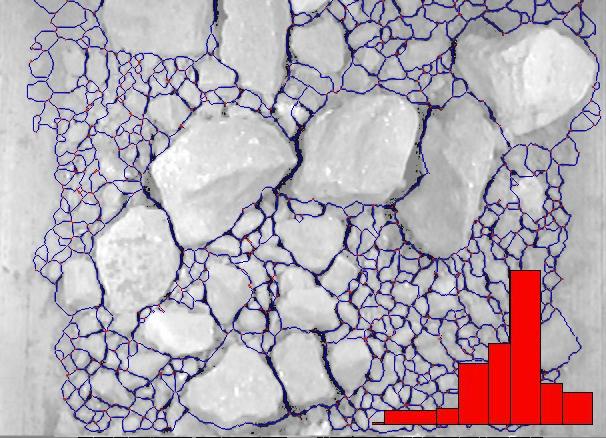

Basic concepts
- Particle size, Grain size, Size distribution, Morphology

Methods and techniques
- Mesh scale, Optical granulometry, Sieve analysis, Soil gradation

Related concepts
- Granulation, Granular material, Mineral dust, Pattern recognition, Dynamic light scattering

In granulometry, the particle-size distribution (PSD) of a powder, or granular material, or particles dispersed in fluid, is a list of values or a mathematical function that defines the relative amount, typically by mass, of particles present according to size. Significant energy is usually required to disintegrate soil, etc. particles into the PSD that is then called a grain size distribution.

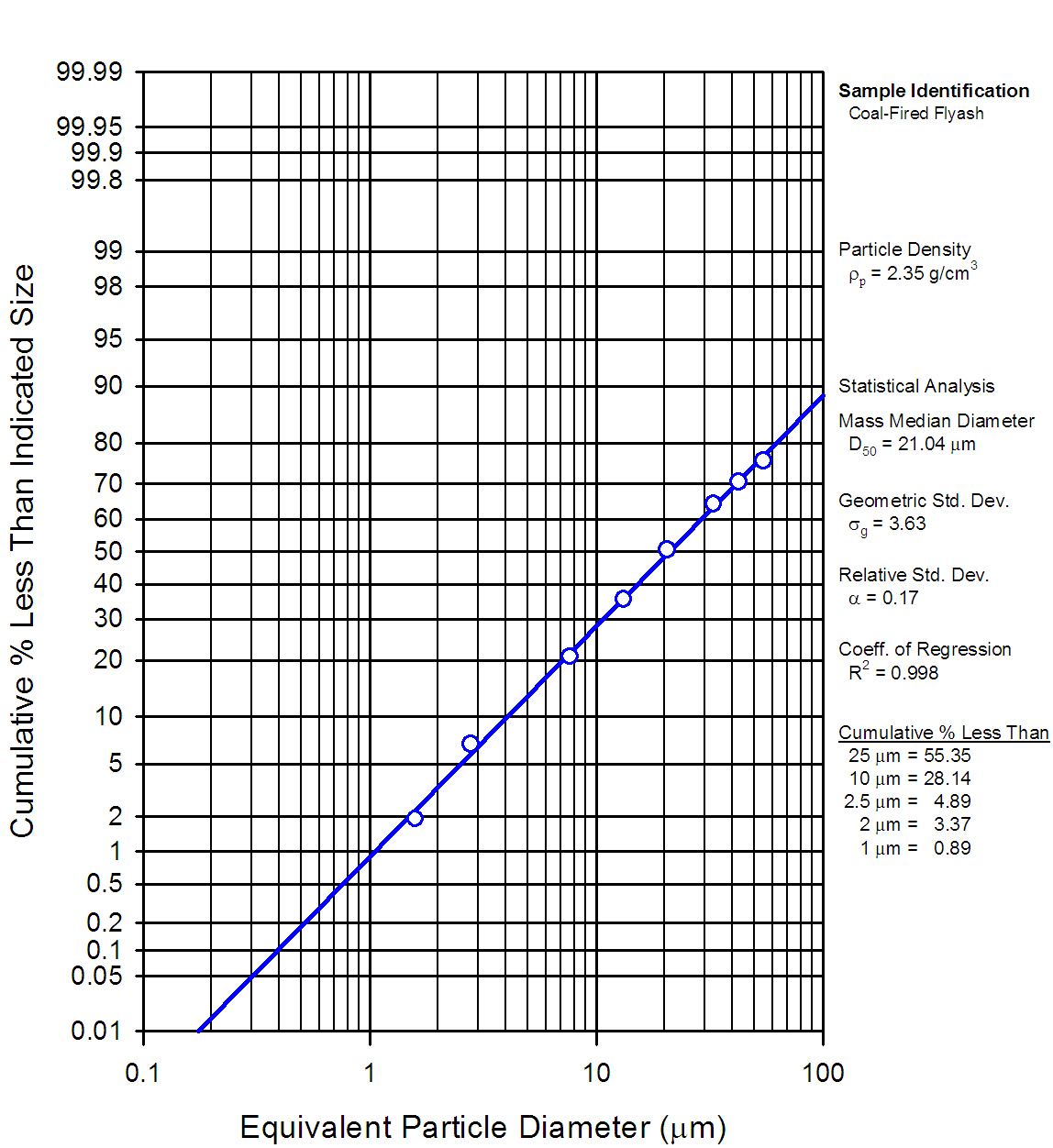
A log-normal distribution of coal-fired fly ash.

== Significance ==
The PSD of a material can be important in understanding its physical and chemical properties. It affects the strength and load-bearing properties of rocks and soils. It affects the reactivity of solids participating in chemical reactions, and needs to be tightly controlled in many industrial products such as the manufacture of printer toner, cosmetics, and pharmaceutical products.

== Significance in the collection of particulate matter ==
Particle size distribution can greatly affect the efficiency of any collection device.

Settling chambers will normally only collect very large particles, those that can be separated using sieve trays.

Centrifugal collectors will normally collect particles down to about 20 μm. Higher efficiency models can collect particles down to 10 μm.

Fabric filters are one of the most efficient and cost effective types of dust collectors available and can achieve a collection efficiency of more than 99% for very fine particles.

Wet scrubbers that use liquid are commonly known as wet scrubbers. In these systems, the scrubbing liquid (usually water) comes into contact with a gas stream containing dust particles. The greater the contact of the gas and liquid streams, the higher the dust removal efficiency.

Electrostatic precipitators use electrostatic forces to separate dust particles from exhaust gases. They can be very efficient at the collection of very fine particles.

Filter Press used for filtering liquids by cake filtration mechanism. The PSD plays an important part in the cake formation, cake resistance, and cake characteristics. The filterability of the liquid is determined largely by the size of the particles.

== Nomenclature ==
ρ_{p}: Actual particle density (g/cm^{3})

ρ_{g}: Gas or sample matrix density (g/cm^{3})

r^{2}: Least-squares coefficient of determination. The closer this value is to 1.0, the better the data fit to a hyperplane representing the relationship between the response variable and a set of covariate variables. A value equal to 1.0 indicates all data fit perfectly within the hyperplane.

λ: Gas mean free path (cm)

D_{50}: Mass-median-diameter (MMD). The log-normal distribution mass median diameter. The MMD is considered to be the average particle diameter by mass.

σ_{g}: Geometric standard deviation. This value is determined mathematically by the equation:

σ_{g} = D_{84.13}/D_{50} = D_{50}/D_{15.87}

The value of σ_{g} determines the slope of the least-squares regression curve.

α: Relative standard deviation or degree of polydispersity. This value is also determined mathematically. For values less than 0.1, the particulate sample can be considered to be monodisperse.

α = σ_{g}/D_{50}

Re_{(P)} : Particle Reynolds Number. In contrast to the large numerical values noted for flow Reynolds number, particle Reynolds number for fine particles in gaseous mediums is typically less than 0.1.

Re_{f} : Flow Reynolds number.

Kn: Particle Knudsen number.

== Types ==
PSD is usually defined by the method by which it is determined. The most easily understood method of determination is sieve analysis, where powder is separated on sieves of different sizes. Thus, the PSD is defined in terms of discrete size ranges: e.g. "% of sample between 45 μm and 53 μm", when sieves of these sizes are used. The PSD is usually determined over a list of size ranges that covers nearly all the sizes present in the sample. Some methods of determination allow much narrower size ranges to be defined than can be obtained by use of sieves, and are applicable to particle sizes outside the range available in sieves. However, the idea of the notional "sieve", that "retains" particles above a certain size, and "passes" particles below that size, is universally used in presenting PSD data of all kinds.

The PSD may be expressed as a "range" analysis, in which the amount in each size range is listed in order. It may also be presented in "cumulative" form, in which the total of all sizes "retained" or "passed" by a single notional "sieve" is given for a range of sizes. Range analysis is suitable when a particular ideal mid-range particle size is being sought, while cumulative analysis is used where the amount of "under-size" or "over-size" must be controlled.

The way in which "size" is expressed is open to a wide range of interpretations. A simple treatment assumes the particles are spheres that will just pass through a square hole in a "sieve". In practice, particles are irregular – often extremely so, for example in the case of fibrous materials – and the way in which such particles are characterized during analysis is very dependent on the method of measurement used.

== Sampling ==
Before a PSD can be determined, it is vital that a representative sample is obtained. In the case where the material to be analysed is flowing, the sample must be withdrawn from the stream in such a way that the sample has the same proportions of particle sizes as the stream. The best way to do this is to take many samples of the whole stream over a period, instead of taking a portion of the stream for the whole time.^{p. 6} In the case where the material is in a heap, scoop or thief sampling needs to be done, which is inaccurate: the sample should ideally have been taken while the powder was flowing towards the heap.^{p. 10} After sampling, the sample volume typically needs to be reduced. The material to be analysed must be carefully blended, and the sample withdrawn using techniques that avoid size segregation, for example using a rotary divider^{p. 5}. Particular attention must be paid to avoidance of loss of fines during manipulation of the sample.

== Measurement techniques ==
=== Sieve analysis ===
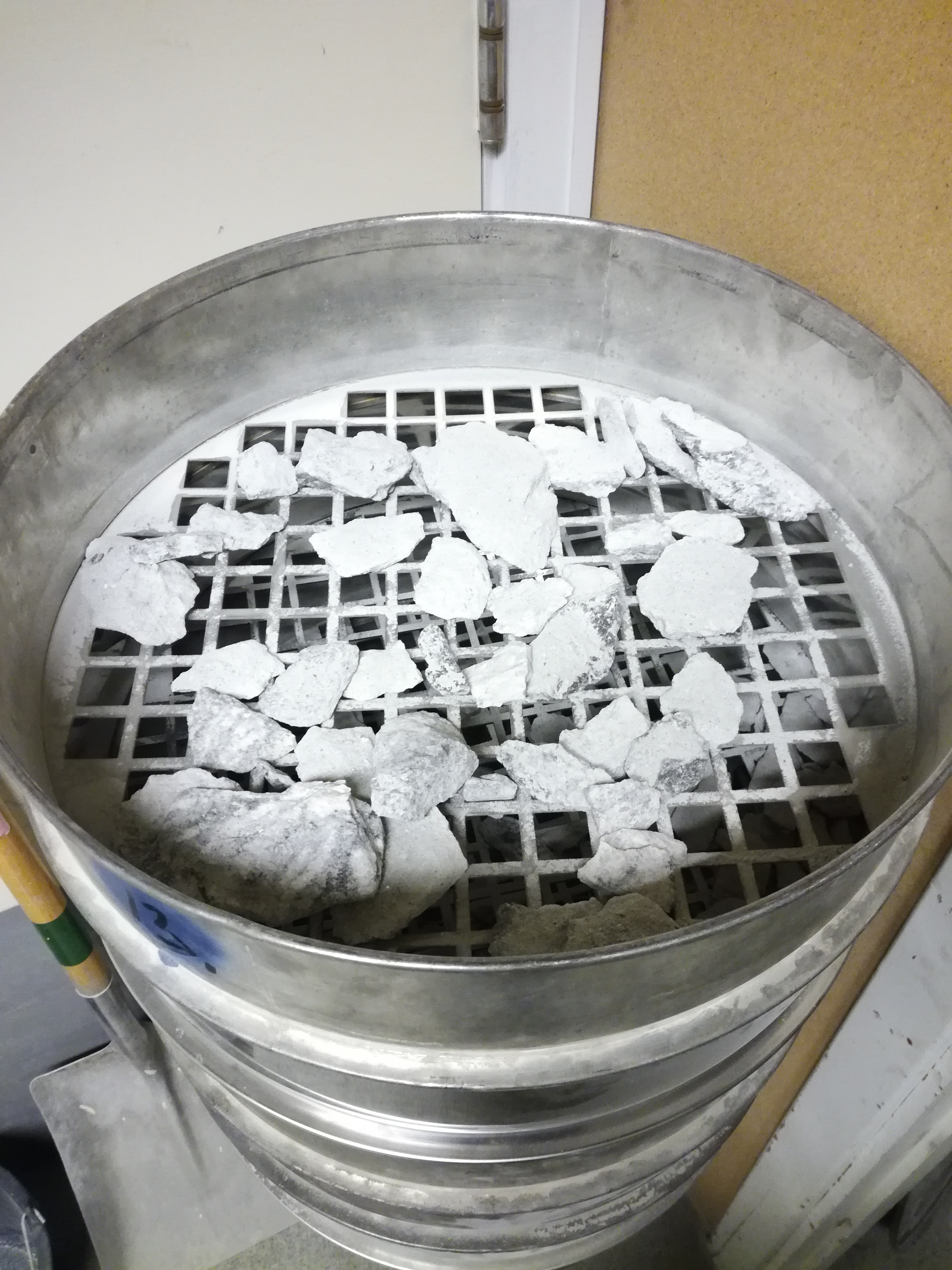
Sieve analysis apparatus

Sieve analysis is often used because of its simplicity, cheapness, and ease of interpretation. Methods may be simple shaking of the sample in sieves until the amount retained becomes more or less constant. Alternatively, the sample may be washed through with a non-reacting liquid (usually water) or blown through with an air current.

Advantages: this technique is well-adapted for bulk materials. A large amount of materials can be readily loaded into 8-inch-diameter (200 mm) sieve trays. Two common uses in the powder industry are wet-sieving of milled limestone and dry-sieving of milled coal.

Disadvantages: many PSDs are concerned with particles too small for separation by sieving to be practical. A very fine sieve, such as 37 μm sieve, is exceedingly fragile, and it is very difficult to get material to pass through it. Another disadvantage is that the amount of energy used to sieve the sample is arbitrarily determined. Over-energetic sieving causes attrition of the particles and thus changes the PSD, while insufficient energy fails to break down loose agglomerates. Although manual sieving procedures can be ineffective, automated sieving technologies using image fragmentation analysis software are available. These technologies can sieve material by capturing and analyzing a photo of material.

=== Air elutriation analysis ===
Material may be separated by means of air elutriation, which employs an apparatus with a vertical tube through which fluid is passed at a controlled velocity. When the particles are introduced, often through a side tube, the smaller particles are carried over in the fluid stream while the large particles settle against the upward current. If we start with low flow rates small less dense particle attain terminal velocities, and flow with the stream, the particle from the stream is collected in overflow and hence will be separated from the feed. Flow rates can be increased to separate higher size ranges. Further size fractions may be collected if the overflow from the first tube is passed vertically upwards through a second tube of greater cross-section, and any number of such tubes can be arranged in series.

Advantages: a bulk sample is analyzed using centrifugal classification and the technique is non-destructive. Each cut-point can be recovered for future size-respective chemical analyses. This technique has been used for decades in the air pollution control industry (data used for design of control devices). This technique determines particle size as a function of settling velocity in an air stream (as opposed to water, or some other liquid).

Disadvantages: a bulk sample (about ten grams) must be obtained. It is a fairly time-consuming analytical technique. The actual test method has been withdrawn by ASME due to obsolescence. Instrument calibration materials are therefore no longer available.

=== Photoanalysis ===
Materials can now be analysed through photoanalysis procedures. Unlike sieve analyses which can be time-consuming and inaccurate, taking a photo of a sample of the materials to be measured and using software to analyze the photo can result in rapid, accurate measurements. Another advantage is that the material can be analyzed without being handled. This is beneficial in the agricultural industry, as handling of food products can lead to contamination. Photoanalysis equipment and software is currently being used in mining, forestry and agricultural industries worldwide.

=== Optical counting methods ===
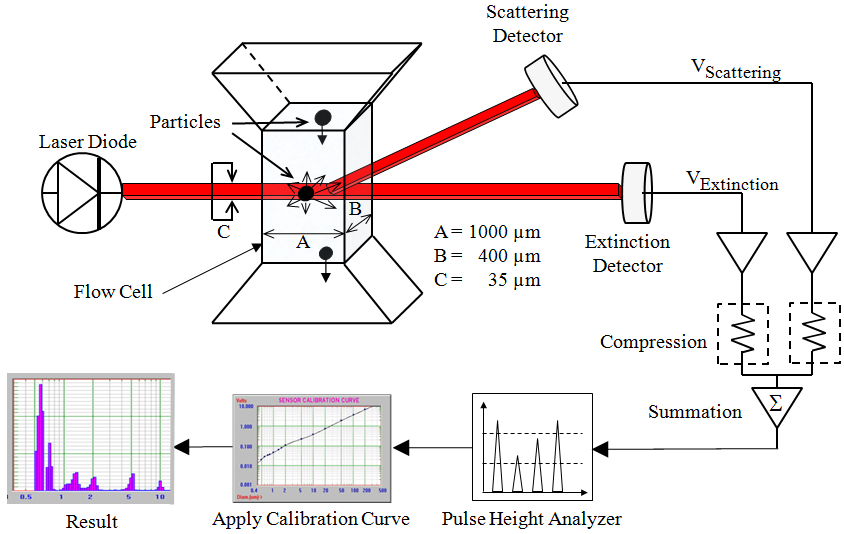
Principle of Single Particle Optical Sizing (SPOS) method.

PSDs can be measured microscopically by sizing against a graticule and counting, but for a statistically valid analysis, millions of particles must be measured. This is impossibly arduous when done manually, but automated analysis of electron micrographs is now commercially available. It is used to determine the particle size within the range of 0.2 to 100 micrometers.

=== Electroresistance counting methods ===
An example of this is the Coulter counter, which measures the momentary changes in the conductivity of a liquid passing through an orifice that take place when individual non-conducting particles pass through. The particle count is obtained by counting pulses. This pulse is proportional to the volume of the sensed particle.

Advantages: very small sample aliquots can be examined.

Disadvantages: sample must be dispersed in a liquid medium... some particles may (partially or fully) dissolve in the medium altering the size distribution. The results are only related to the projected cross-sectional area that a particle displaces as it passes through an orifice. This is a physical diameter, not really related to mathematical descriptions of particles (e.g. terminal settling velocity).

=== Sedimentation techniques ===
These are based upon study of the terminal velocity acquired by particles suspended in a viscous liquid. Sedimentation time is longest for the finest particles, so this technique is useful for sizes below 10 μm, but sub-micrometer particles cannot be reliably measured due to the effects of Brownian motion. Typical apparatus disperses the sample in liquid, then measures the density of the column at timed intervals. Other techniques determine the optical density of successive layers using visible light or x-rays.

Advantages: this technique determines particle size as a function of settling velocity.

Disadvantages: Sample must be dispersed in a liquid medium... some particles may (partially or fully) dissolve in the medium altering the size distribution, requiring careful selection of the dispersion media. Density is highly dependent upon fluid temperature remaining constant. X-Rays will not count carbon (organic) particles. Many of these instruments can require a bulk sample (e.g. two to five grams).

=== Laser diffraction methods ===
Principle of laser diffraction analysis.

These depend upon analysis of the "halo" of diffracted light produced when a laser beam passes through a dispersion of particles in air or in a liquid. The angle of diffraction increases as particle size decreases, so that this method is particularly good for measuring sizes between 0.1 and 3,000 μm. Advances in sophisticated data processing and automation have allowed this to become the dominant method used in industrial PSD determination. This technique is relatively fast and can be performed on very small samples. A particular advantage is that the technique can generate a continuous measurement for analyzing process streams. Laser diffraction measures particle size distributions by measuring the angular variation in intensity of light scattered as a laser beam passes through a dispersed particulate sample. Large particles scatter light at small angles relative to the laser beam and small particles scatter light at large angles. The angular scattering intensity data is then analyzed to calculate the size of the particles responsible for creating the scattering pattern, using the Mie theory or Fraunhofer approximation of light scattering. The particle size is reported as a volume equivalent sphere diameter.

=== Laser Obscuration Time" (LOT) or "Time Of Transition" (TOT) ===
A focused laser beam rotates in a constant frequency and interacts with particles within the sample medium. Each randomly scanned particle obscures the laser beam to its dedicated photo diode, which measures the time of obscuration.

The time of obscuration directly relates to the particle's Diameter, by a simple calculation principle of multiplying the known beam rotation Velocity in the directly measured Time of obscuration, (D=V*t).

=== Acoustic spectroscopy or ultrasound attenuation spectroscopy ===
Instead of light, this method employs ultrasound for collecting information on the particles that are dispersed in fluid. Dispersed particles absorb and scatter ultrasound similarly to light. This has been known since Lord Rayleigh developed the first theory of ultrasound scattering and published a book "The Theory of Sound" in 1878. There have been hundreds of papers studying ultrasound propagation through fluid particulates in the 20th century. It turns out that instead of measuring scattered energy versus angle, as with light, in the case of ultrasound, measuring the transmitted energy versus frequency is a better choice. The resulting ultrasound attenuation frequency spectra are the raw data for calculating particle size distribution. It can be measured for any fluid system with no dilution or other sample preparation. This is a big advantage of this method. Calculation of particle size distribution is based on theoretical models that are well verified for up to 50% by volume of dispersed particles on micron and nanometer scales. However, as concentration increases and the particle sizes approach the nanoscale, conventional modelling gives way to the necessity to include shear-wave re-conversion effects in order for the models to accurately reflect the real attenuation spectra.

=== Air pollution emissions measurements ===
Cascade impactors – particulate matter is withdrawn isokinetically from a source and segregated by size in a cascade impactor at the sampling point exhaust conditions of temperature, pressure, etc. Cascade impactors use the principle of inertial separation to size segregate particle samples from a particle laden gas stream. The mass of each size fraction is determined gravimetrically. The California Air Resources Board Method 501 is currently the most widely accepted test method for particle size distribution emissions measurements.

== Mathematical models ==
=== Probability distributions ===
- The log-normal distribution is often used to approximate the particle size distribution of aerosols, aquatic particles and pulverized material.
- The Weibull distribution or Rosin–Rammler distribution is a useful distribution for representing particle size distributions generated by grinding, milling and crushing operations.
- The log-hyperbolic distribution was proposed by Bagnold and Barndorff-Nielsen to model the particle-size distribution of naturally occurring sediments. This model suffers from having non-unique solutions for a range of probability coefficients.
- The skew log-Laplace model was proposed by Fieller, Gilbertson and Olbricht as a simpler alternative to the log-hyperbolic distribution.

==== Rosin–Rammler distribution ====
The Weibull distribution, now named for Waloddi Weibull was first identified by Fréchet (1927) and first applied by Rosin & Rammler (1933) to describe particle size distributions. It is still widely used in mineral processing to describe particle size distributions in comminution processes.

$$F(x;P_{\rm{80}},m) =  \begin{cases}
1-e^{\ln\left(0.2\right)\left(\frac{x}{P_{\rm{80}}}\right)^m} & x\geq0 ,\\
0 & x<0 ,\end{cases}$$

where

$x$: Particle size
$P_{\rm{80}}$: 80th percentile of the particle size distribution
$m$: Parameter describing the spread of the distribution

The inverse distribution is given by:

$$f(F;P_{\rm{80}},m) =  \begin{cases}
P_{\rm{80}} \sqrt[m] {\frac{\ln(1-F)}{\ln(0.2)}} & F>0 ,\\
0 & F\leq0 ,\end{cases}$$

where

$F$: Mass fraction

===== Parameter estimation =====
The parameters of the Rosin–Rammler distribution can be determined by refactoring the distribution function to the form

$$\ln\left(-\ln\left(1-F\right)\right) =
m\ln(x)+ \ln\left(\frac{-\ln(0.2)}{(P_{\rm{80}})^m}\right)$$

Hence the slope of the line in a plot of

$\ln\left(-\ln\left(1-F\right)\right)$ versus $\ln(x)$

yields the parameter $m$ and $P_{\rm{80}}$ is determined by substitution into

$$P_{\rm{80}} = \left(\frac{-\ln(0.2)}{e^{intercept}}\right)^\frac{1}{m}$$

== See also ==
- Particle size
- Sauter mean diameter — mathematical description of average particle size, based on an idealized sphere
- De Brouckere mean diameter —determination of average particle size from measurements
- Granulometry (morphology)
- Optical granulometry
- Raindrop size distribution
