= Granule =

A granule is a large particle or grain. It can refer to:

- Granule (cell biology), any of several submicroscopic structures, some with explicable origins, others noted only as cell type-specific features of unknown function
  - Azurophilic granule, a structure characteristic of the azurophil eukaryotic cell type
  - Chromaffin granule, a structure characteristic of the chromophil eukaryotic cell type.
- Astrophysics and geology:
  - Granule (solar physics), a visible structure in the photosphere of the Sun arising from activity in the Sun's convective zone
  - Martian spherules, spherical granules of material found on the surface of the planet Mars
  - Granule (geology), a specified particle size of 2–4 millimetres (-1 to -2 on the φ scale)
- Granule, in pharmaceutical terms, small particles gathered into a larger, permanent aggregate in which the original particles can still be identified
- Granule (Oracle DBMS), a unit of contiguously allocated virtual memory
- Granular synthesis of sound

== See also ==
- Granularity, extent to which a material or system is composed of distinguishable particles
- Granular material, any conglomeration of discrete solid, macroscopic particles (grains)
- Granule cell, a neuron with a small cell body
- Grain (disambiguation)
- Granulation (disambiguation)
- Granulometry (disambiguation)
