= Mineral dust =

Dust made from soil minerals

Granulometry
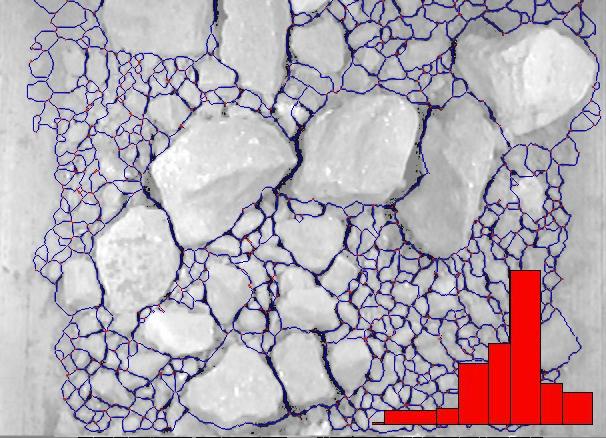

Basic concepts
- Particle size, Grain size, Size distribution, Morphology

Methods and techniques
- Mesh scale, Optical granulometry, Sieve analysis, Soil gradation

Related concepts
- Granulation, Granular material, Mineral dust, Pattern recognition, Dynamic light scattering

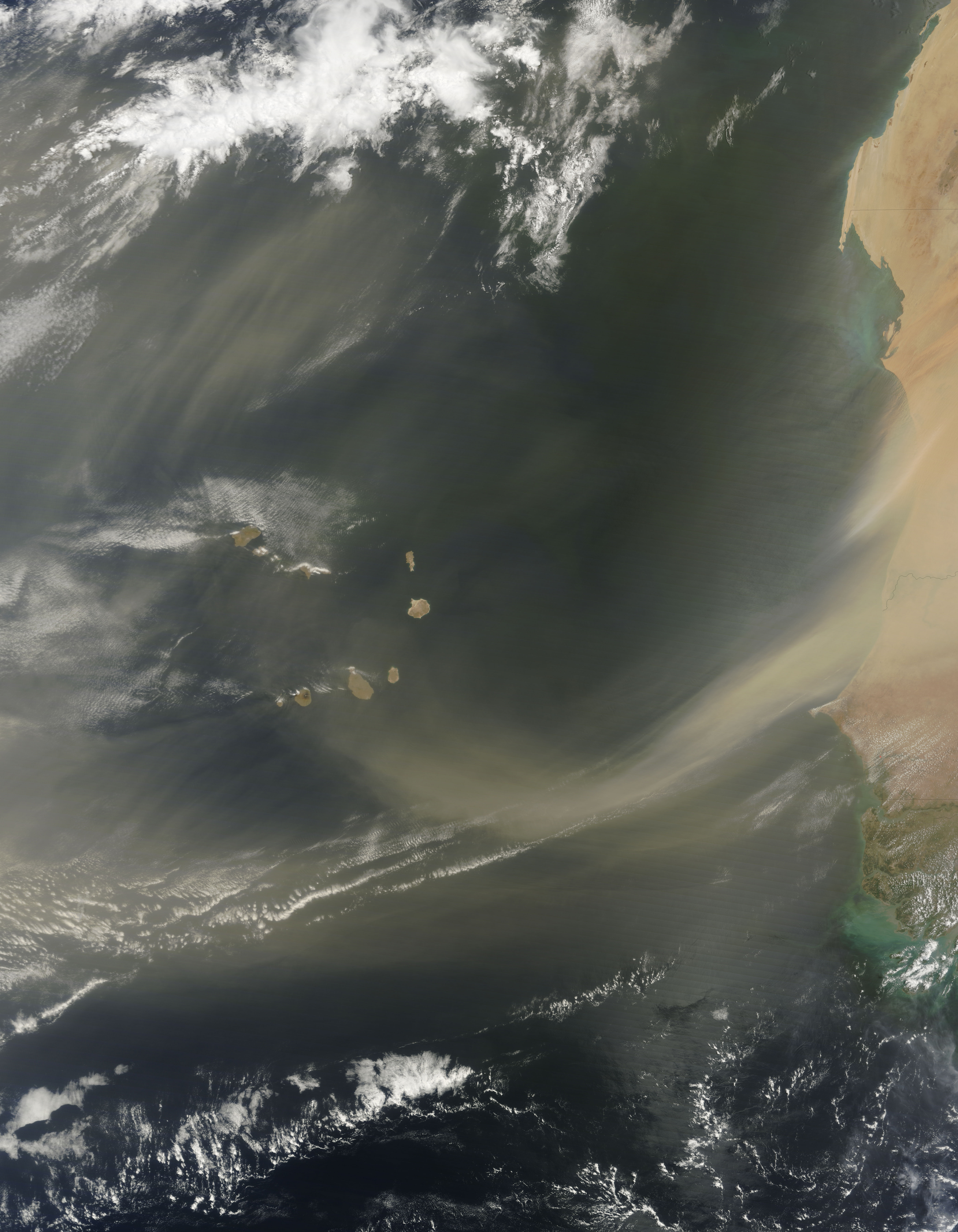
Dust Plumes off Western Africa and the Cape Verde Islands.

Mineral dust is an atmospheric aerosol originated from the suspension of minerals constituting the soil, composed of various oxides and carbonates. Human activities lead to 25% of the airborne dust (particulates) load in the atmosphere. The Sahara Desert is the major source of mineral dust, which subsequently spreads across the Mediterranean (where it is the origin of rain dust) and Caribbean seas into northern South America, Central America, and eastern North America, and Europe. Additionally, it plays a significant role in the nutrient inflow to the Amazon rainforest. The Gobi Desert is another source of dust in the atmosphere, which affects eastern Asia and western North America.

== Characteristics ==
Mineral dust is mainly constituted of the oxides (SiO_{2}, Al_{2}O_{3}, FeO, Fe_{2}O_{3}, CaO, and others) and carbonates (CaCO_{3}, MgCO_{3}) that constitute the Earth's crust. The composition of mineral dust, usually named in atmospheric sciences as mineralogy composition, is relevant for different physical and chemical processes in the atmosphere, for example, oxides with iron have an effect in the optical properties with impact in climate, while minor components can modify the role in the atmosphere of mineral dust as cloud condensation nuclei.

Global mineral dust emissions are estimated at 1000-5000 million tons per year, of which the largest part is attributed to deserts. Although this aerosol class is usually considered of natural origin, it is estimated that about a quarter of mineral dust emissions could be ascribed to human activities through desertification and land use changes. Recent studies highlight that the fraction of large particles (called coarse dust) may be higher than previously thought and total emissions would be therefore also higher.

Large dust concentrations may cause problems to people having respiratory problems. Another effect of dust clouds is more colorful sunsets.

== Saharan dust ==
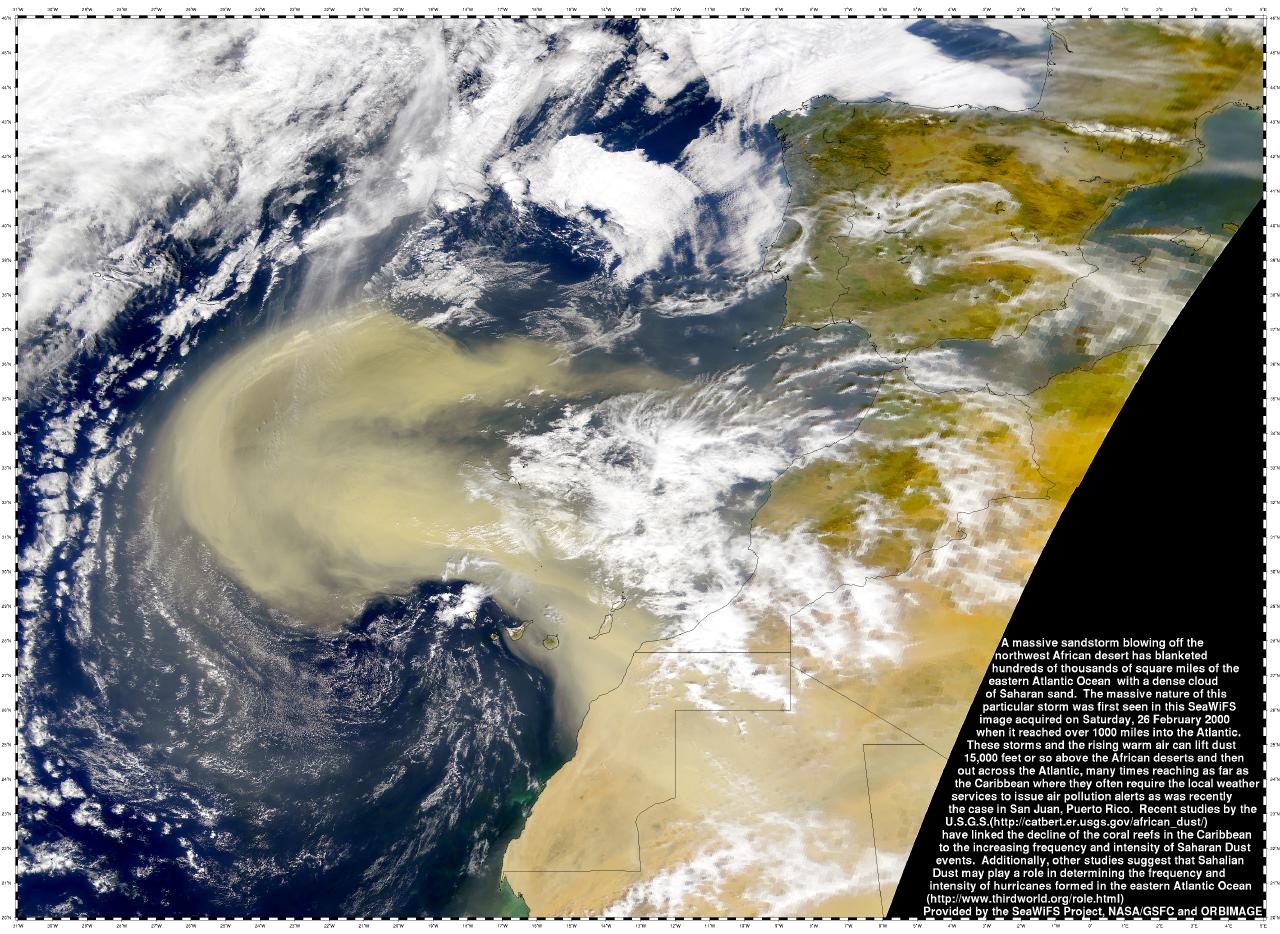
Satellite photo of a Saharan dust cloud (2000) over the Eastern Atlantic Ocean.

The Sahara is the major source on Earth of mineral dust (60-200 million tons per year). Saharan dust can be lifted by convection over hot desert areas, and can thus reach very high altitudes; from there it can be transported worldwide by winds, covering distances of thousands of kilometers. The dust combined with the extremely hot, dry air of the Sahara Desert often forms an atmospheric layer called the Saharan Air Layer which has significant effects on tropical weather, especially as it interferes with the development of hurricanes.

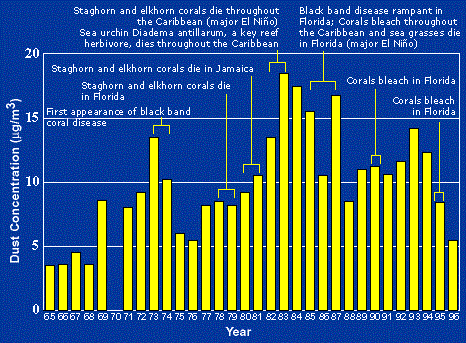
Graph linking dust to various coral deaths across the Caribbean Sea and Florida.

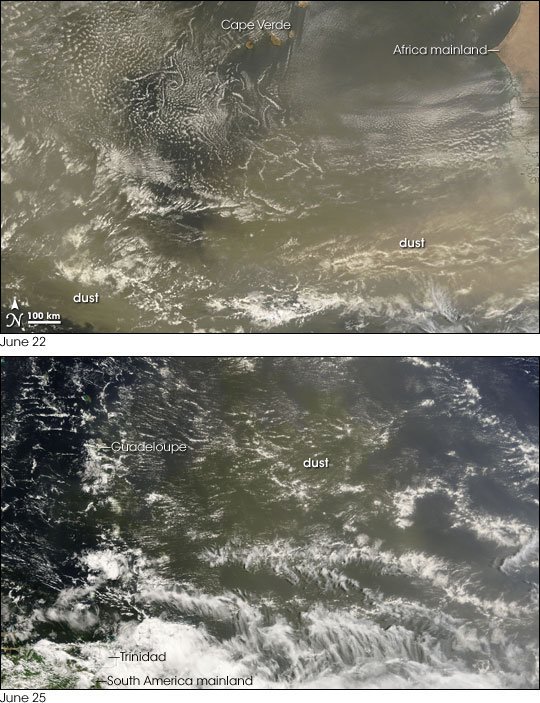
Images showing Saharan dust crossing the Atlantic.

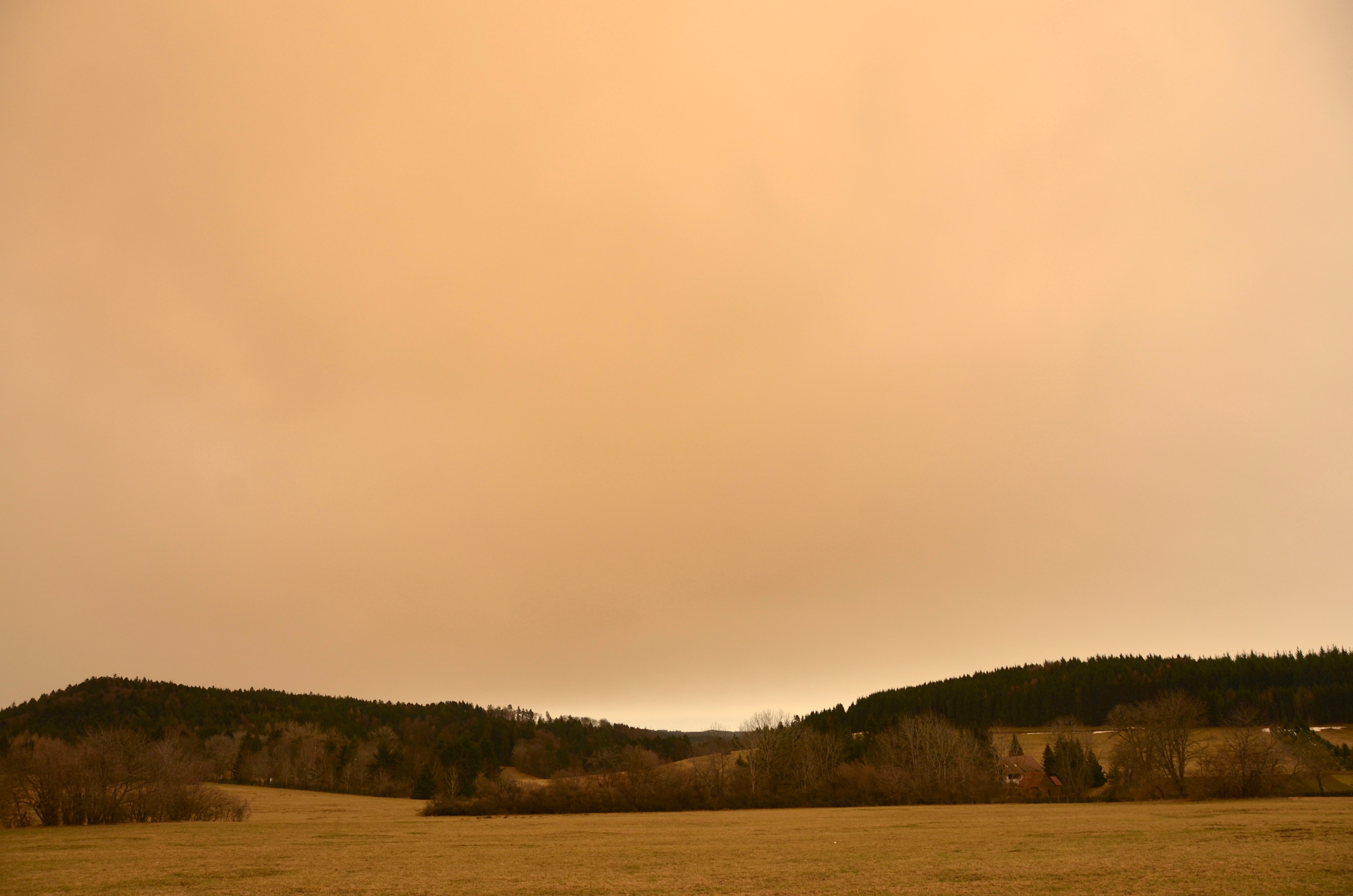
Saharan dust seen on Swabian Jura (Germany)

There is a large variability in the dust transport across the Atlantic into the Caribbean and Florida from year to year. In some years African dust is observed along much of the East Coast of the United States and is visible in the sky. Due to the trade winds, very large concentrations of mineral dust can be found in the tropical Atlantic, reaching the Caribbean; moreover episodic transport to the Mediterranean region. Saharan plumes can form iberulites (a particular tropospheric aggregation of aerosols) when these plumes travel through North Africa and the eastern North Atlantic Ocean, and often reach the circum-Mediterranean areas of Western Europe. In the Mediterranean region, Saharan dust is important as it represents the major source of nutrients for phytoplankton and other aquatic organisms. Saharan dust carries the fungus Aspergillus sydowii and others. Aspergillus borne by Saharan dust falls into the Caribbean Sea and possibly infects coral reefs with Sea Fan disease (aspergillosis). It also has been linked to increased incidence of pediatric asthma attacks in the Caribbean. Since 1970, dust outbreaks have worsened due to periods of drought in Africa. Dust events have been linked to a decline in the health of coral reefs across the Caribbean and Florida, primarily since the 1970s.

=== Effect on hurricane frequency ===
According to a NASA article, NASA satellites have shown that "the chilling effect of dust was responsible for one-third of the drop in North Atlantic sea surface temperatures between June 2005 and 2006, possibly contributing to the difference in hurricane activity between the two seasons." There were only 5 hurricanes in 2006 compared with 15 in 2005.

It is known that one of the major factors that create hurricanes is warm water temperatures on the surface of the ocean. Evidence shows that dust from the Sahara desert caused surface temperatures to be cooler in 2006 than in 2005.

== Asian dust ==
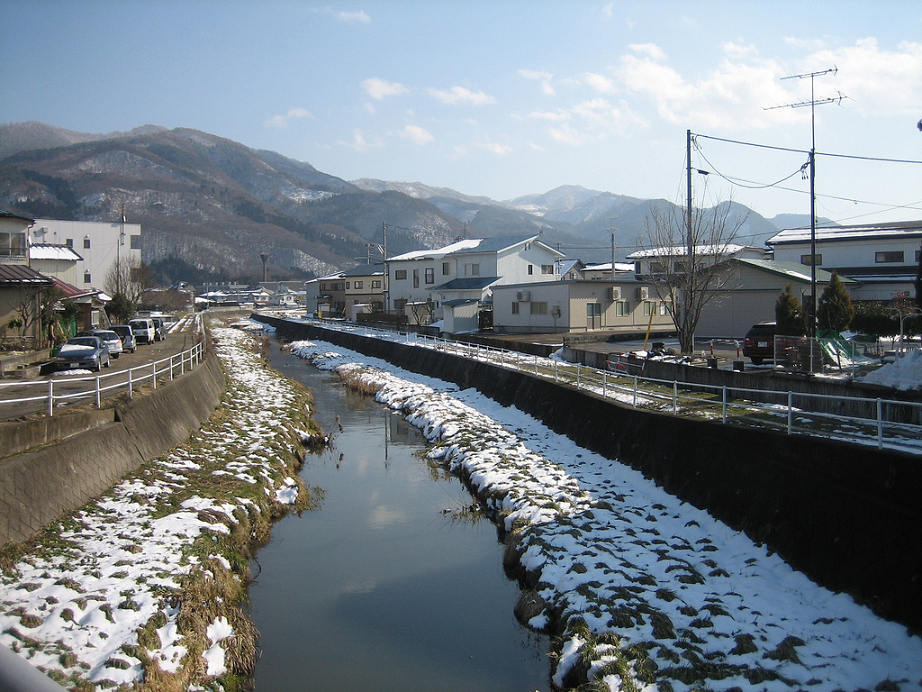
Aizuwakamatsu, Japan with clear skies.

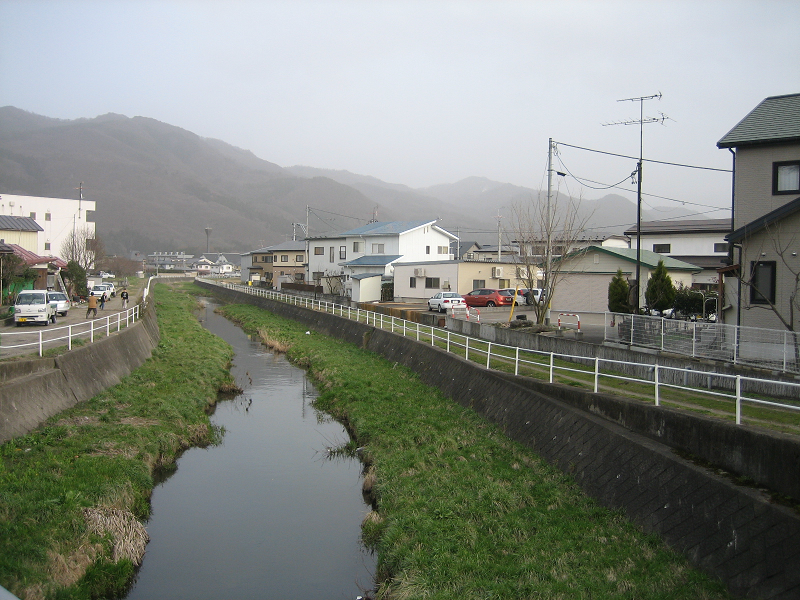
Aizuwakamatsu, Japan shrouded in Asian Dust on April 2nd, 2007.

In Eastern Asia, mineral dust events that originate in the Gobi Desert (Southern Mongolia and Northern China) during springtime give rise to the phenomenon called Asian dust. The aerosols are carried eastward by prevailing winds, and pass over China, Korea, and Japan. Sometimes, significant concentrations of dust can be carried as far as the Western United States. Areas affected by Asian dust experience decreased visibility and health problems, such as sore throat and respiratory difficulties. The effects of Asian dust, however, are not strictly negative, as it is thought that its deposition enriches the soil with important trace minerals.

An American study analyzing the composition of Asian dust events reaching Colorado associates them to the presence of carbon monoxide, possibly incorporated in the air mass as it passes over industrialized regions in Asia. Although dust storms in the Gobi desert have occurred from time to time throughout history, they became a pronounced problem in the second half of the 20th century due to intensified agricultural pressure and desertification.

== North American dust ==
Mineral dust originates from several sources on the North American continent including the Southwest, the Great Plains, and Alaska. In the Southwest, dust impacts human health, visibility, lake productivity, and the rate of snowmelt in the Rocky Mountains. Dust deposition has increased dramatically since the early 1800s compared to the natural background due to the intensification of human activities.

=== Relationship to drought ===
Arid and semi-arid regions are naturally prone to dust emissions. Soil moisture is an important variable controlling dust emissions, along with vegetation cover, wind speed and soil type. Several studies based on modern observations show positive relationships (i.e. increasing drought increases dust) between dust and drought conditions in each dust cycle phase, from emissions, to atmospheric burden, to deposition. However, studies based on paleo records of dust deposition (e.g. using lake sediment) that specifically looked at megadroughts show both increases and no change in dust deposition. The study by Routson showed an increase in deposition during megadroughts but used a measure of dust concentration rather than accumulation that is affected by the rate of sedimentation. The Routson study instead used dust accumulation rates and found no difference between dust deposition during drought years and megadroughts and deposition during normal hydroclimate conditions. Instead, they found that dust deposition is more likely controlled by transport mechanisms and sediment supply than by hydroclimate. Similarly, Arcusa found no evidence for higher dust deposition during drought on multi-decadal and centennial scales. They also found that sediment supply played a key role as evidenced from a 60% increase in deposition in the 1800s due to accelerating land disturbance.

== See also ==
- Azores High
- Canary Current
- Dust storm
- Dust Bowl
- Dust devil
- Iberulites
- Iron fertilization
- Sahel
- Western Hemisphere Warm Pool
