= Soil gradation =

Classification of grainy soils based on the sizes of their grains

Granulometry
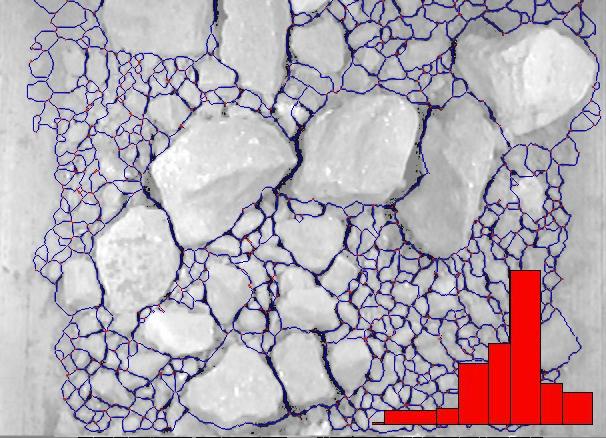

Basic concepts
- Particle size, Grain size, Size distribution, Morphology

Methods and techniques
- Mesh scale, Optical granulometry, Sieve analysis, Soil gradation

Related concepts
- Granulation, Granular material, Mineral dust, Pattern recognition, Dynamic light scattering

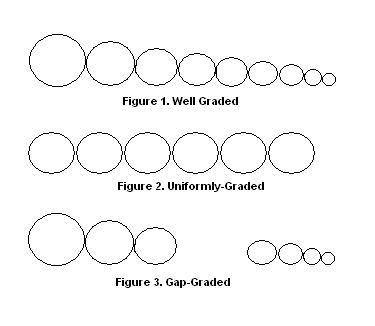
Soil Gradation Categories

In soil science, soil gradation is a classification of a coarse-grained soil that ranks the soil based on the different particle sizes contained in the soil. Soil gradation is an important aspect of soil mechanics and geotechnical engineering because it is an indicator of other engineering properties such as compressibility, shear strength, and hydraulic conductivity. In a design, the gradation of the in situ (on site) soil often controls the design and ground water drainage of the site. A poorly graded soil will have better drainage than a well graded soil, if it is not high in clay quality.

Soil is graded as either well graded or poorly graded. Soil gradation is determined by analyzing the results of a sieve analysis or a hydrometer analysis.

The process for grading a soil is in accordance with either the Unified Soil Classification System or the AASHTO Soil Classification System. Gradation of a soil is determined by reading the grain size distribution curve produced from the results of laboratory tests on the soil. Gradation of a soil can also be determined by calculating the coefficient of uniformity, C_{u}, and the coefficient of curvature, C_{c}, of the soil and comparing the calculated values with published gradation limits.

== Soil gradations ==
Soil gradation is a classification of the particle size distribution of a soil. Coarse-grained soils, mainly gravels or sands, are graded as either well graded or poorly graded. Poorly graded soils are further divided into uniformly-graded or gap-graded soils. Fine-grained soils, mainly silts and clays, are classified according to their Atterberg limits.

=== Well graded ===
A well-graded soil is a soil that contains particles of a wide range of sizes and has a good representation of all sizes from the No. 4 to No. 200 sieves. A well-graded gravel is classified as GW, while a well-graded sand is classified as SW.

=== Poorly graded ===
A poorly-graded soil is a soil that does not have a good representation of all sizes of particles from the no. 4 to no. 200 sieve. A poorly-graded gravel is classified as GP, while a poorly-graded sand is classified as SP. Poorly-graded soils are more susceptible to soil liquefaction than well-graded soils.

A gap-graded soil is a soil that has an excess or deficiency of certain particle sizes or a soil that has at least one particle size missing. An example of a gap-graded soil is one in which sand of the no. 10 and no. 40 sizes are missing, and all the other sizes are present.

=== Process of grading a soil ===
The process of grading a soil is in accordance with either the Unified Soil Classification System or the AASHTO Soil Classification System. The steps in grading a soil are data collection, calculating coefficients of uniformity and curvature, and grading the soil based on the grading criteria given in the used soil classification system.

==== Data collection ====
Soil gradation is determined by analyzing the results of a sieve analysis or a hydrometer analysis.

In a sieve analysis, a coarse-grained soil sample is shaken through a series of woven-wire square-mesh sieves. Each sieve has successively smaller openings so particles larger than the size of each sieve are retained on the sieve. The percentage of each soil size is measured by weighing the amount retained on each sieve and comparing the weight to the total weight of the sample. The results of a sieve analysis are plotted as a grain size distribution curve, which is then analyzed to determine the soil gradation of the particular soil.

In a hydrometer analysis, a fine-grained soil sample is left to settle in a viscous fluid. This method is used based on Stoke's Law which relates terminal velocity of fall of a particle in a viscous fluid to the grain diameter and density of the grain in suspension. Grain diameter is calculated from a known distance and time of the fall of the particle. This is used to classify fine-grained soils.

==== Calculating the coefficients of uniformity and curvature ====
Calculating the coefficients of uniformity and curvature requires grain diameters. The grain diameter can be found for each percent of the soil passing a particular sieve. This means that if 40% of the sample is retained on the No. 200 sieve then there is 60% passing the No. 200 sieve.

The coefficient of uniformity, C_{u} is a crude shape parameter and is calculated using the following equation:

$C_u = \frac {D_{60}}{D_{10}}$

where D_{60} is the grain diameter at 60% passing, and D_{10} is the grain diameter at 10% passing

The coefficient of curvature, C_{c} is a shape parameter and is calculated using the following equation:

$C_c = \frac {(D_{30})^2}{D_{10} \times\ D_{60}}$

where D_{60} is the grain diameter at 60% passing, D_{30} is the grain diameter at 30% passing, and D_{10} is the grain diameter at 10% passing

Once the coefficient of uniformity and the coefficient of curvature have been calculated, they must be compared to published gradation criteria.

==== Criteria for grading soils ====
The following criteria are in accordance with the Unified Soil Classification System:

For a gravel to be classified as well graded, the following criteria must be met:

C_{u} > 4 & 1 < C_{c} < 3

If both of these criteria are not met, the gravel is classified as poorly graded or GP. If both of these criteria are met, the gravel is classified as well graded or GW.

For a sand to be classified as well graded, the following criteria must be met:

C_{u} ≥ 6 & 1 < C_{c} < 3

If both of these criteria are not met, the sand is classified as poorly graded or SP. If both of these criteria are met, the sand is classified as well graded or SW.

=== Importance ===
Soil gradation is very important to geotechnical engineering. It is an indicator of other engineering properties such as compressibility, shear strength, and hydraulic conductivity.

In a design, the gradation of the in situ or on site soil often controls the design and ground water drainage of the site. A poorly graded soil will have better drainage than a well graded soil because there are more void spaces in a poorly graded soil.

When a fill material is being selected for a project such as a highway embankment or earthen dam, the soil gradation is considered. A well graded soil is able to be compacted more than a poorly graded soil. These types of projects may also have gradation requirements that must be met before the soil to be used is accepted.

When options for ground remediation techniques are being selected, the soil gradation is a controlling factor.
