= Mesh (scale) =

Measurement of particle size

Granulometry
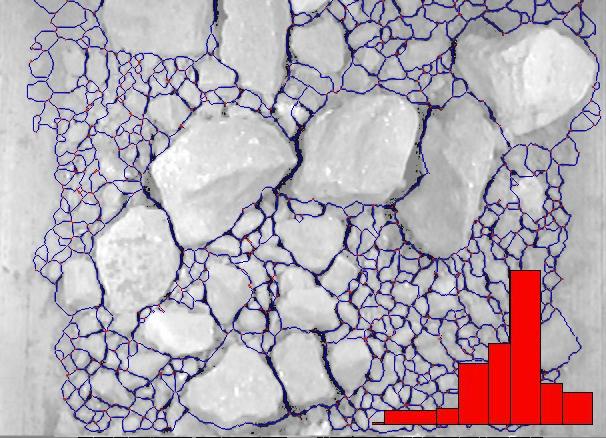

Basic concepts
- Particle size, Grain size, Size distribution, Morphology

Methods and techniques
- Mesh scale, Optical granulometry, Sieve analysis, Soil gradation

Related concepts
- Granulation, Granular material, Mineral dust, Pattern recognition, Dynamic light scattering

Different mesh sizes of sieves

Mesh is a measurement of particle size often used in determining the particle-size distribution of a granular material. For example, a sample from a truckload of peanuts may be placed atop a mesh with 5 mm openings. When the mesh is shaken, small broken pieces and dust pass through the mesh while whole peanuts are retained on the mesh. A commercial peanut buyer might use a test like this to determine if a batch of peanuts has too many broken pieces. This type of test is common in some industries, and, to facilitate uniform testing methods, several standardized mesh series have been established.

Metal surfaces mechanically polished are designated as having a mechanical finish related to the abrasive used.

Many mesh sizes were historically given in the number of holes per inch; due to the width of the wires in the mesh, mesh numbers did not correspond directly to fractional inch sizes, and several different systems standardized with slightly different mesh sizes for the same mesh numbers.

== Commercial dimensions ==
Commercial sieve mesh dimensions
| Sieve size | Opening | | Standard Mesh | | Tensile Bolting Cloth | | | Mill Grade | | | Market Grade | | |
| (mm) | (in) | (μm) | US | Tyler | Mesh | Opening | Wire | Mesh | Opening | Wire | Mesh | Opening | Wire |
|---|---|---|---|---|---|---|---|---|---|---|---|---|---|
| 5.60 | 0.22 | 5600 | 3.5 | – | – | – | – | – | – | – | – | – | – |
| 4.75 | 0.187 | 4750 | 4 | – | – | – | – | – | – | – | – | – | – |
| 4.00 | 0.157 | 4000 | 5 | – | – | – | – | – | – | – | – | – | – |
| 3.35 | 0.132 | 3350 | 6 | – | – | – | – | – | – | – | – | – | – |
| 2.80 | 0.110 | 2800 | 7 | – | – | – | – | – | – | – | – | – | – |
| 2.36 | 0.093 | 2360 | 8 | – | – | – | – | – | – | – | – | – | – |
| 2.00 | 0.079 | 2000 | 10 | – | – | – | – | – | – | – | – | – | – |
| 1.70 | 0.0661 | 1700 | 12 | 10 | 14 | 0.062 | 0.009 | 12 | 0.065 | 0.018 | 12 | 0.0603 | 0.023 |
| 1.40 | 0.0555 | 1400 | 14 | 12 | 16 | 0.0535 | 0.009 | 14 | 0.054 | 0.017 | 14 | 0.051 | 0.0204 |
| 1.18 | 0.0469 | 1180 | 16 | 14 | 18 | 0.0466 | 0.009 | 16 | 0.0465 | 0.016 | 16 | 0.0445 | 0.0181 |
| 1.00 | 0.0394 | 1000 | 18 | 16 | 22 | 0.0380 | 0.0075 | 18 | 0.0406 | 0.015 | 18 | 0.0386 | 0.0173 |
| 0.85 | 0.0331 | 850 | 20 | 20 | 24 | 0.0342 | 0.0075 | 20 | 0.0360 | 0.014 | 20 | 0.034 | 0.0162 |
| 0.71 | 0.0278 | 710 | 25 | 24 | 28 | 0.0282 | 0.0075 | 24 | 0.0287 | 0.013 | 24 | 0.0277 | 0.014 |
| 0.60 | 0.0232 | 600 | 30 | 28 | 34 | 0.0229 | 0.0065 | 30 | 0.0238 | 0.0095 | – | – | – |
| 0.50 | 0.0197 | 500 | 35 | 32 | 38 | 0.0198 | 0.0065 | 34 | 0.0204 | 0.009 | 30 | 0.0203 | 0.0128 |
| 0.47 | – | 470 | | – | 40 | 0.0185 | 0.0065 | 36 | 0.0188 | 0.009 | – | – | – |
| 0.465 | – | 465 | | – | 42 | 0.0183 | 0.0055 | 38 | 0.0178 | 0.0085 | – | – | – |
| 0.437 | – | 437 | | – | 44 | 0.0172 | 0.0055 | – | – | – | 35 | 0.0176 | 0.0118 |
| 0.425 | 0.0165 | 425 | 40 | 35 | 46 | 0.0162 | 0.0055 | 40 | 0.0165 | 0.0085 | – | – | – |
| 0.389 | – | 389 | | – | 48 | 0.0153 | 0.0055 | – | – | – | 40 | 0.0150 | 0.0104 |
| 0.368 | – | 368 | | – | 50 | 0.0145 | 0.0055 | – | – | – | – | – | – |
| 0.355 | 0.0139 | 355 | 45 | 42 | 52 | 0.0137 | 0.0055 | 45 | 0.0142 | 0.008 | – | – | – |
| 0.310 | – | 310 | | – | 60 | 0.0122 | 0.0045 | 50 | 0.0125 | 0.0075 | – | – | – |
| 0.300 | 0.0117 | 300 | 50 | 48 | 62 | 0.0116 | 0.0045 | 55 | 0.0112 | 0.007 | – | – | – |
| 0.282 | – | 282 | | – | 64 | 0.0111 | 0.0045 | – | – | – | 50 | 0.0110 | 0.0090 |
| 0.270 | – | 270 | | – | 70 | 0.0106 | 0.0037 | – | – | – | – | – | – |
| 0.260 | – | 260 | | – | 72 | 0.0102 | 0.0037 | – | – | – | – | – | – |
| 0.250 | 0.0098 | 250 | 60 | 60 | 74 | 0.0098 | 0.0037 | 60 | 0.0102 | 0.0065 | – | – | – |
| 0.241 | – | 241 | | – | 76 | 0.0095 | 0.0037 | – | – | – | – | – | – |
| 0.231 | – | – | – | – | 78 | 0.0091 | 0.0037 | – | – | – | 60 | 0.0092 | 0.0075 |
| 0.212 | 0.0083 | 212 | 70 | 65 | 84 | 0.0084 | 0.0035 | – | – | – | – | – | – |
| 0.193 | – | – | – | – | 90 | 0.0076 | 0.0035 | – | – | – | – | – | – |
| 0.180 | 0.0070 | 180 | 80 | 80 | 94 | 0.0071 | 0.0035 | – | – | – | 80 | 0.0070 | 0.0055 |
| 0.165 | – | – | – | – | 105 | 0.0065 | 0.0030 | – | – | – | – | – | – |
| 0.150 | 0.0059 | 150 | 100 | 100 | 120 | 0.0058 | 0.0025 | – | – | – | 100 | 0.0055 | 0.0045 |
| 0.125 | 0.0049 | 125 | 120 | 115 | 145 | 0.0047 | 0.0022 | – | – | – | 120 | 0.0046 | 0.0037 |
| 0.105 | 0.0041 | 105 | 140 | 150 | 165 | 0.0042 | 0.0019 | – | – | – | 150 | 0.0041 | 0.0026 |
| 0.090 | 0.0035 | 90 | 170 | 170 | 200 | 0.0034 | 0.0016 | – | – | – | 180 | 0.0033 | 0.0023 |
| 0.075 | 0.0029 | 75 | 200 | 200 | 230 | 0.0029 | 0.0014 | – | – | – | 200 | 0.0029 | 0.0021 |
| 0.063 | 0.0024 | 63 | 230 | 250 | – | – | – | – | – | – | 250 | 0.0024 | 0.0016 |
| 0.053 | 0.0021 | 53 | 270 | 270 | 300 | 0.0021 | 0.0012 | – | – | – | 270 | 0.0021 | 0.0016 |
| 0.044 | 0.0017 | 44 | 325 | 325 | – | – | – | – | – | – | 325 | 0.0017 | 0.0014 |
| 0.037 | 0.0015 | 37 | 400 | 400 | – | – | – | – | – | – | 400 | 0.0015 | 0.0010 |
| 0.025 | 0.0010 | 25 | 500 | – | – | – | – | – | – | – | 500 | 0.0010 | 0.0010 |
| 0.020 | 0.0008 | 20 | 625 | – | – | – | – | – | – | – | 625 | 0.0008 | – |
| 0.015 | 0.0006 | 15 | 800 | – | – | – | – | – | – | – | 800 | 0.0006 | – |
| 0.010 | 0.0004 | 10 | 1250 | – | – | – | – | – | – | – | 1250 | 0.0004 | – |
| 0.005 | 0.0002 | 5 | 2500 | – | – | – | – | – | – | – | 2500 | 0.0002 | – |

Equivalent mesh sizes from 5 μm to 25.4 mm also exist.

Available sieve sizes are usually regulated by standards. Those in common use are ISO 565:1990 and ISO 3310-1:2000 (international), EN 933-1(European) and ASTM E11:01 (US). EN standards are available with national 'badging'; so they appear as BS EN, FR EN, DE EN, etc.

== Practical sizes ==
Although such information contains long lists of sieve sizes, in practice sieves are normally used in series in which each member sieve is selected to pass particles approximately 1/√2 smaller in diameter or 1/2 smaller in cross-sectional area than the previous sieve. For example the series 80mm, 63, 40, 31.5, 20, 16, 14, 10, 8, 6.3, 4, 2.8, 2 mm is routinely available in many European countries or the series with the larger steps 63, 31.5, 16, 8, 4, 2, 1 mm, 500 μm, 250, 125, 63 μm is commonly used to grade aggregates in the construction industry. Such series are somewhat derived from the principles originally established by Renard and now known as Renard series. Some users replace some of those indicated above with 45, 22.4, 12.5, 11.2 and 5.6 mm sieves, mostly because of historical usage of such sizes in their country or industry.
