= Granulometry (morphology) =

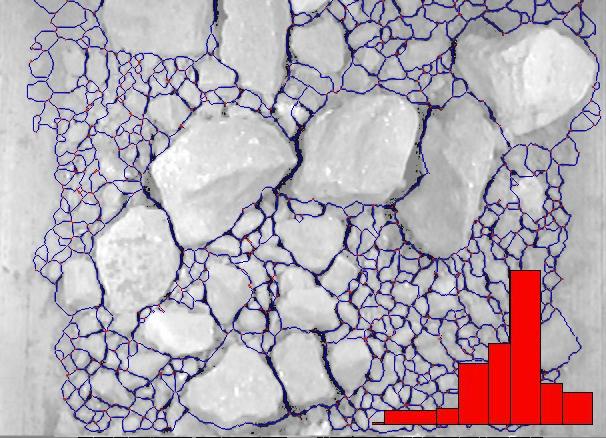

Basic concepts
- Particle size, Grain size, Size distribution, Morphology

Methods and techniques
- Mesh scale, Optical granulometry, Sieve analysis, Soil gradation

Related concepts
- Granulation, Granular material, Mineral dust, Pattern recognition, Dynamic light scattering

In mathematical morphology, granulometry is an approach to compute a size distribution of grains in binary images, using a series of morphological opening operations. It was introduced by Georges Matheron in the 1960s, and is the basis for the characterization of the concept of size in mathematical morphology.

== Granulometry generated by a structuring element ==
Let B be a structuring element in a Euclidean space or grid E, and consider the family $\{B_k\}$, $k=0,1,\ldots$, given by:

$$B_k=\underbrace{B\oplus\ldots\oplus B}_{k\mbox{ times}}$$,

where $\oplus$ denotes morphological dilation. By convention, $B_0$ is the set containing only the origin of E, and $B_1=B$.

Let X be a set (i.e., a binary image in mathematical morphology), and consider the series of sets $\{\gamma_k(X)\}$, $k=0,1,\ldots$, given by:

$$\gamma_k(X)=X\circ B_k$$,

where $\circ$ denotes the morphological opening.

The granulometry function $G_k(X)$ is the cardinality (i.e., area or volume, in continuous Euclidean space, or number of elements, in grids) of the image $\gamma_k(X)$:

$$G_k(X)=|\gamma_k(X)|$$.

The pattern spectrum or size distribution of X is the collection of sets $\{PS_k(X)\}$, $k=0,1,\ldots$, given by:

$$PS_k(X) = G_{k}(X)-G_{k+1}(X)$$.

The parameter k is referred to as size, and the component k of the pattern spectrum $PS_k(X)$ provides a rough estimate for the amount of grains of size k in the image X. Peaks of $PS_k(X)$ indicate relatively large quantities of grains of the corresponding sizes.

== Sieving axioms ==
The above common method is a particular case of the more general approach derived by Georges Matheron. The French mathematician was inspired by sieving as a means of characterizing size. In sieving, a granular sample is worked through a series of sieves with decreasing hole sizes. As a consequence, the different grains in the sample are separated according to their sizes.

The operation of passing a sample through a sieve of certain hole size "k" can be mathematically described as an operator $\Psi_k(X)$ that returns the subset of elements in X with sizes that are smaller or equal to k. This family of operators satisfies the following properties:

1. Anti-extensivity: Each sieve reduces the amount of grains, i.e., $\Psi_k(X)\subseteq X$,
2. Increasingness: The result of sieving a subset of a sample is a subset of the sieving of that sample, i.e., $X\subseteq Y\Rightarrow\Psi_k(X)\subseteq\Psi_k(Y)$,
3. "Stability": The result of passing through two sieves is determined by the sieve with the smallest hole size. I.e., $\Psi_k\Psi_m(X)=\Psi_m\Psi_k(X)=\Psi_{\min(k,m)}(X)$.

A granulometry-generating family of operators should satisfy the above three axioms.

In the above case (granulometry generated by a structuring element), $\Psi_k(X)=\gamma_k(X)=X\circ B_k$.

Another example of granulometry-generating family is when $\Psi_k(X)=\bigcup_{i=1}^{N} X\circ (B^{(i)})_k$, where $\{B^{(i)}\}$ is a set of linear structuring elements with different directions.

== See also ==
- Particle-size distribution
- Grain size
- Optical granulometry
