= Micromeritics =

Science and technology of small particles

Micromeritics is the science of the behavior of particulate materials smaller than 75 μm. It is thus the study of the fundamental and derived properties of individual as well as a collection of particles. Micromeritics involves materials with larger particles than nanoparticles where they are smaller than 0.1 μm.

The knowledge and control of the size of particles has importance in pharmacy and materials science. The size, and hence the surface area of a particle, can be related to the physical, chemical and pharmacological properties of drugs. Clinically, the particle size of a drug can affect its release from dosage forms that are administered orally, parenterally, rectally and topically. The successful formulation of suspensions, emulsions and tablets; both physical stability and pharmacological response also depends on the particle size achieved in the product.

== Origin ==
The term was coined by Joseph Marius DallaValle in his book Micromeritics: The Technology of Fine Particles (1948). It was derived from the Greek words Greek: μικρο, romanized: micro meaning "small" and Greek: μέρος, romanized: méros meaning "part". The size range which he covered in the book was from 100 nm to 100 mm. Anything smaller than this but bigger than a molecule was referred to at the time as a colloid but is now often referred to as a nanoparticle.

Applications included soil physics, mineral physics, chemical engineering, geology, and hydrology. Characteristics discussed included particle size and shape, packing, electrical, optical, chemical and surface science.

== Applications ==
=== Release and dissolution ===
Particle size and surface area influence the release of a drug from a dosage form that is administered orally, rectally, parenterally, and topically. Higher surface area brings about intimate contact of the drug with the dissolution fluids in vivo and increases the drug solubility and dissolution.

=== Absorption and drug action ===
Particle size and surface area influence the drug absorption and subsequently the therapeutic action. The higher the dissolution, the faster the absorption and hence the quicker and greater the drug action.

=== Physical stability ===
Micromeritic properties of a particle, i.e. the particle size in a formulation, influence the physical stability of the suspensions and emulsions. The smaller the size of the particle, the better the physical stability of the dosage form owing to the Brownian motion of the particles in the dispersion.

=== Dose uniformity ===
Good flow properties of granules and powders are important in the manufacturing of tablets and capsules. The distribution of particles should be uniform in terms of number and weight. Very small particle size causes attraction, which in turn destabilises the suspension by coagulating.

== See also ==
- Micro-encapsulation
- Microbeads
- Microparticle
- Physical chemistry
