= Optical granulometry =

Photographic measurement of the distribution of grain sizes in a material

Granulometry
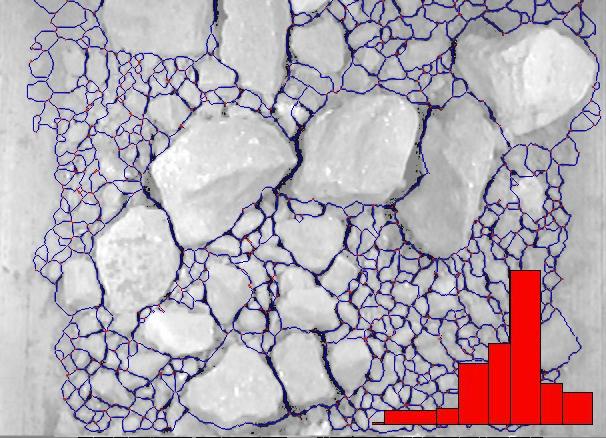

Basic concepts
- Particle size, Grain size, Size distribution, Morphology

Methods and techniques
- Mesh scale, Optical granulometry, Sieve analysis, Soil gradation

Related concepts
- Granulation, Granular material, Mineral dust, Pattern recognition, Dynamic light scattering

Optical granulometry is the process of measuring the different grain sizes in a granular material, based on a photograph. Technology has been created to analyze a photograph and create statistics based on what the picture portrays. This information is vital in maintaining machinery in various trades worldwide. Mining companies can use optical granulometry to analyze inactive or moving rock to quantify the size of these fragments. Forestry companies can zero in on wood chip sizes without stopping the production process, and minimize sizing errors.

With more photoanalysis technologies being produced, mining companies have shown an increased interest in these types of systems because of their ability to maintain efficiency throughout the mining process. Companies are saving millions of dollars annually because of this new technology, and are cutting back on maintenance costs on equipment.

In order for optical granulometry to be completely successful, an accurate photo must be taken – under sufficient lighting, and using proper technology – to obtain quantified results. If these requirements are met, an image analysis system can be implemented.

== The process ==
Software uses four basic steps in determining the average size of material:

Step 1: Taking a photo- A sample of the material you would like to measure

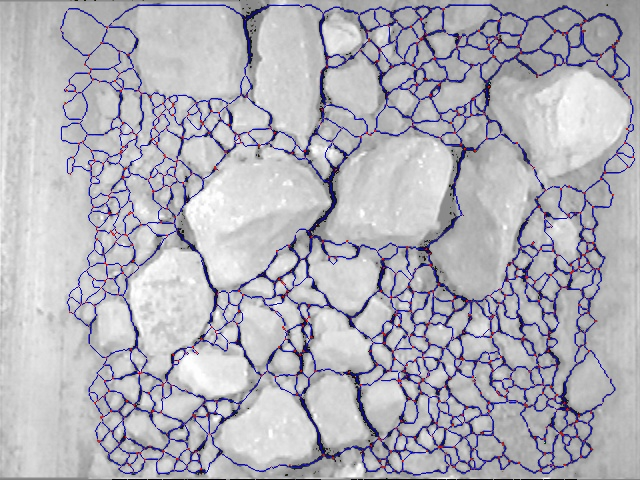
Step 2: Edge Detection- By completing an edge detection process, the software can determine the various sizes of material in the photo

Step 3: Virtual Sieve- The length to width ratio is measured in this step of the process. The individual particle sizes are measured instantly.

Step 4: Graphical Output- In this step, statistical data and size distribution is plotted on an easy-to-read form for operators.

See the Wikipedia article on Photoanalysis to see how mining, forestry and agricultural companies are using this technology to improve quality control techniques.

== Smartphone-based, segmentation-free estimation of grain size distribution ==
Recently, a methodology has emerged by which soil grain size distribution can be inferred from optical images acquired with commodity smartphones by training convolutional neural networks to predict parameters of the distribution curve directly from the image, without explicit image segmentation. In this approach, a standardized image of a soil surface is captured under controlled conditions, preprocessed to reduce device-specific variability, and passed to a regression model that outputs the parameters of a cumulative distribution function e.g., a two-parameter Weibull curve. The resulting distribution can be used to derive geotechnical descriptors and class boundaries.

== See also ==
- Particle-size distribution
- Grain size
- Granulometry (morphology)
