= Photoanalysis =

Photoanalysis (or photo analysis) refers to the study of pictures to compile various types of data, for example, to measure the size distribution of virtually anything that can be captured by photo. Photoanalysis technology has changed the way mines and mills quantify fragmented material.

Images are an effective way to document conditions before, after, and even during blasting activities. The technology is advancing at a high rate, and lenses, storage media memory, light sensitivity and resolution have been improving steadily. Today's digital cameras and camcorders include high-resolution optics, compact size, automatic time and date stamps, good battery life, shutters to freeze motion, and computers to autofocus and eliminate jitter using image stabilization.

== Mining ==
Photoanalysis in mining operations can provide an automated system that forewarns a company of potential problems with materials, leading to economies and reduced damage caused from over-sized materials. It can also help determine the effectiveness of blasts.

A company can use this technology to monitor materials moving on a conveyor belt in an underground environment, to measure piles left over from a blast, and even measure the amount of material being carried by dump trucks or vessels to a destination.

Photoanalysis is being used on SAG mills worldwide to control the size of rock being crushed. Companies are using this technology to determine the size of particles being processed in the SAG Mill. Having oversize material entering the SAG mill makes an operation less efficient, costing companies money in electrical and maintenance costs. Photoanalysis technology can eliminate unwanted material before it enters the mill, keeping rock crushing costs low.

== Forestry ==
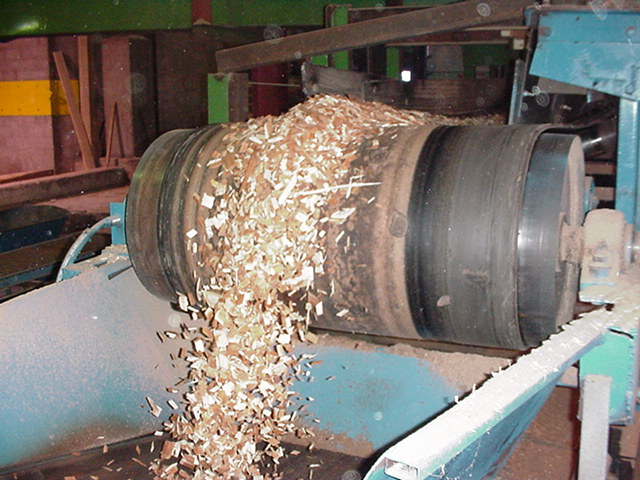

Wood chip size can affect the overall quality of a product. With automated photoanalysis systems, companies can remove any unwanted wrong-size particles without stopping their mill process.

Photoanalysis can affect how efficiently forestry companies operate. In mills worldwide, photoanalysis technology is improving the use of lumber products, cutting back on the amount of trees being used to operate, and saving companies money through quality control optimization.

With the current downturn in the North American forestry industry, operators are looking at making their mills more efficient and effective when processing materials. Photoanalysis technology helps identify any weaknesses in the process by continuously monitoring different sections of an operation.

== Agriculture ==
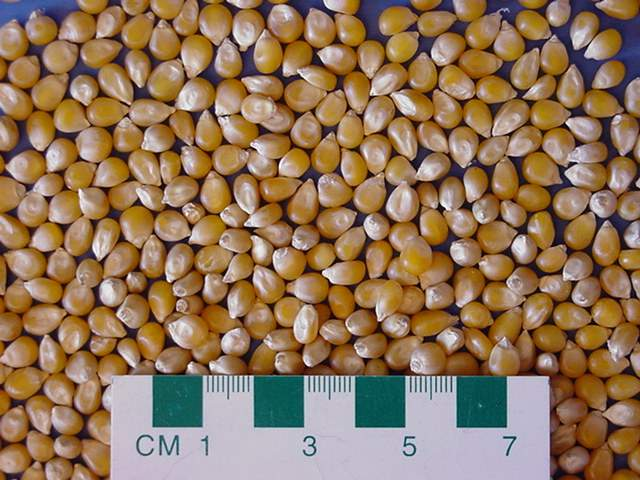
Woodchip Analyzer

Agricultural companies can, using photoanalysis, monitor conveyor belts of food without contaminating the product by touching it. Other benefits of photoanalysis systems include:

- Automated removal of any unwanted material on food conveyor
- Improved quality control for the most important parts of the agricultural process
- Pinpoint accuracy that helps the efficiency and effectiveness of product handling techniques

The importance of photoanalysis technology is being noticed by the agricultural industry as it identifies any unwanted materials going through the process. In an example, if a mouse is on a conveyor of corn, photoanalysis technology would be able to identify the unwanted object and remove it before it contaminates the whole process.

== Origins of photoanalysis technology ==
Photoanalysis technology was created by using the Waterloo Image Enhancement Process in the 1980s. After further development of the imaging process with explosives producer DuPont, engineers Tom Palangio and Takis Katsabanis began selling photoanalysis software commercially. They later renamed the process WipFrag, standing for Waterloo Image Process Fragmentation

Today, photoanalysis technology has evolved into stabilized and portable systems that can automatically capture and analyze results instantly. Thousands of these products are currently being used around the world to measure fragmented material.

== Photoanalysis equipment photos ==
Photoanalysis Data

Stabilized Photoanalysis System

Dump Truck Analyzing System

Portable Photoanalysis System

== Fragmentation analysis ==
Fragmentation analysis is becoming a popular term in mining, agricultural and forestry industries. With the majority of money in these industries directed towards the proper sizing of materials, companies are using fragmentation analysis to determine various factors within an operation.

The two main ways a company keeps track of fragmented material are through manual and automated sieving procedures. Manual sieving involves extracting a sample of material to analyze the size distribution. The results can be tabulated within two days. Automated sieving is an advanced way of sieving materials running through a process. Without having to extract the material, photoanalysis can take place, allowing for immediate results with pinpoint accuracy.

== Blast Fragmentation Software ==
Operators are using fragmentation analysis to determine the effectiveness of various blasts. With automated sieving technology, workers can track the success of these blasts and receive instant results. Companies are using these results to determine what blasting method yielded the best results for their specific operation. The common variables associated with blast optimization are the provided Particle Size Distribution (PSD) from a shovel fragmentation system, geology including rock type and fracturing, and energy factor.

By using photoanalysis the fragmented materials can be monitored, offering pinpoint accuracy and allowing mine operators to make adjustments to future blasting procedures. See Optical Granulometry to view the automated sieving process.

== Pre-crushing analysis ==

Maintenance costs can be significantly reduced if an operation focuses on the fragmentation of the particles passing through their process. Automated sieving systems can detect and help remove any oversize material before it enters the crusher and causes maintenance problems. It also helps determine the effectiveness of the mining process prior to crushing; the sizing of material is always a critical part of operations in the mining, forestry and agricultural industries.

Having an analysis taking place at every major point in an operation allows for the proper tracking of material being processed. Engineers can then determine what part of the process needs improving based solely on the size of material.

== Post-crushing analysis ==
Measuring how effective industrial crushers are, can help save a company millions of dollars in energy costs on an annual basis. There are two components that affect a typical crusher: the size of the material inputted, and the speed at which the crusher is moving. If the user can find a perfect balance between these two components, the materials will be crushed to the right size in the shortest time possible.

Meeting the material standards set by governments and large companies can be hard. Having a post-crushing analysis taking place ensures that no oversize material gets shipped; eliminating the chance of getting fined for not meeting industry specifications.

== See also ==
- Optical granulometry for more information on the photoanalysis process
