= Grain size =

Diameter of individual grains of sediment, or of lithified particles in clastic rocks

Granulometry
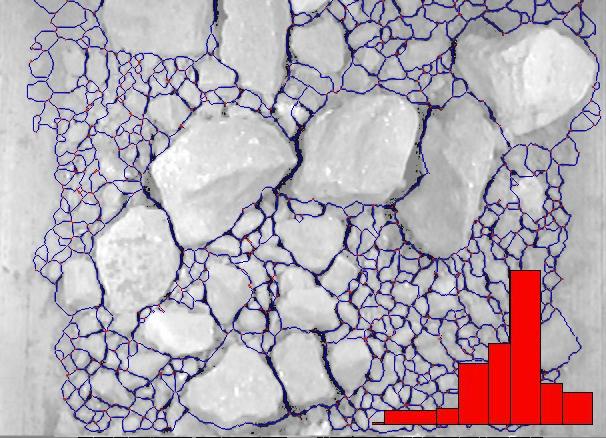

Basic concepts
- Particle size, Grain size, Size distribution, Morphology

Methods and techniques
- Mesh scale, Optical granulometry, Sieve analysis, Soil gradation

Related concepts
- Granulation, Granular material, Mineral dust, Pattern recognition, Dynamic light scattering

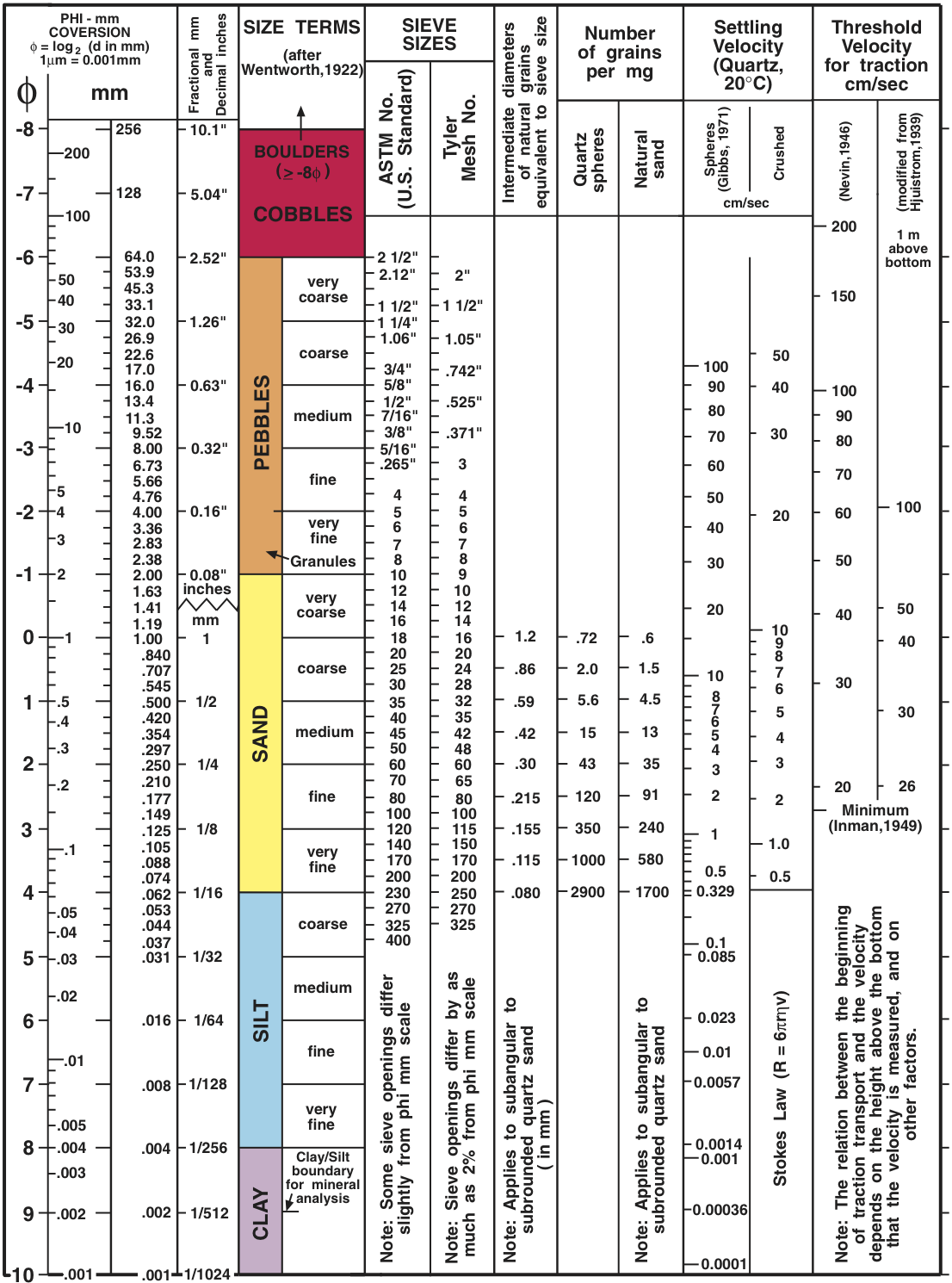
Wentworth grain size chart from United States Geological Survey Open-File Report 2006-1195: Note size typos; 33.1mm is 38.1 & .545mm is .594

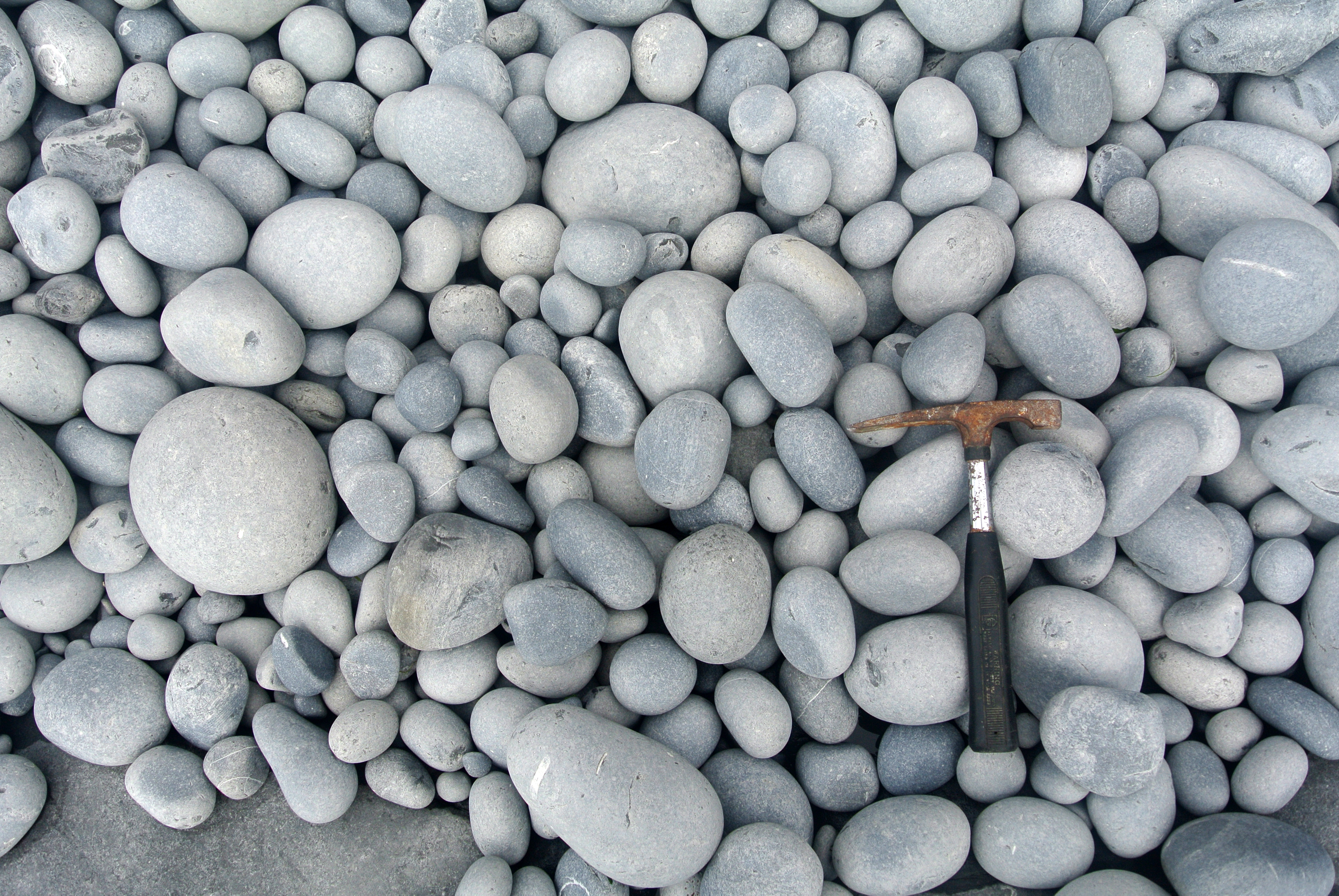
Beach cobbles at Nash Point, South Wales

Grain size (or particle size) is the diameter of individual grains of sediment, or the lithified particles in clastic rocks. The term may also be applied to other granular materials. This is different from the crystallite size, which refers to the size of a single crystal inside a particle or grain. A single grain can be composed of several crystals. Granular material can range from very small colloidal particles, through clay, silt, sand, gravel, and cobbles, to boulders.

== Krumbein phi scale ==
Size ranges define limits of classes that are given names in the Wentworth scale (or Udden–Wentworth scale named after geologists Chester K. Wentworth and Johan A. Udden) used in the United States. The Krumbein phi (φ) scale, a modification of the Wentworth scale created by W. C. Krumbein in 1934, is a logarithmic scale computed by the equation

$$\varphi=-\log_2{\frac{D}{D_0}},$$

where

$\varphi$ is the Krumbein phi scale,
$D$ is the diameter of the particle or grain in millimeters (Krumbein and Monk's equation) and
$D_0$ is a reference diameter, equal to 1 mm (to make the equation dimensionally consistent).

This equation can be rearranged to find diameter using φ:

$$D=D_0 \cdot 2^{-\varphi}\,$$

φ Scale			Size Range						Terminology
φ Scale			Metric			Inches (approx.)			Wentworth
≤ −8			≥ 256 mm			≥ 10.1 in			Boulder
−8	to	−7	256 mm	to	128 mm	10.1 in	to	5.04 in	Cobble
−7	to	−6	128 mm	to	64 mm	5.04 in	to	2.52 in	Cobble
−6	to	−5	64 mm	to	32 mm	2.52 in	to	1.26 in	Pebble
−5	to	−4	32 mm	to	16 mm	1.26 in	to	0.63 in	Pebble
−4	to	−3	16 mm	to	8 mm	0.63 in	to	0.31 in	Pebble
−3	to	−2	8 mm	to	4 mm	0.31 in	to	0.16 in	Pebble
−2	to	−1	4 mm	to	2 mm	0.16 in	to	0.08 in	Granule
−1	to	0	2 mm	to	1 mm	0.08 in	to	0.04 in	Sand
0	to	1	1 mm	to	0.5 mm	0.04 in	to	0.02 in	Sand
1	to	2	0.5 mm	to	0.25 mm	0.02 in	to	0.01 in	Sand
2	to	3	250 μm	to	125 μm	0.01 in	to	0.005 in	Sand
3	to	4	125 μm	to	62.5 μm	0.005 in	to	0.0025 in	Sand
4	to	5	62.5 μm	to	31.3 μm	0.0025 in	to	0.0012 in	Silt
5	to	6	31.3 μm	to	15.6 μm	0.0012 in	to	0.0006 in	Silt
6	to	7	15.6 μm	to	7.81 μm	0.0006 in	to	0.0003 in	Silt
7	to	8	7.81 μm	to	3.91 μm	0.0003 in	to	0.00015 in	Silt
8	to	9	3.91 μm	to	1.95 μm	0.00015 in	to	7.7×10^{-5} in	Clay
9	to	10	1.95 μm	to	0.98 μm	7.7×10^{-5} in	to	3.8×10^{-5} in	Clay
10	to	20	977 nm	to	0.95 nm	3.8×10^{-5} in	to	3.8×10^{-8} in	Colloid

In some schemes, gravel is anything larger than sand (comprising granule, pebble, cobble, and boulder in the table above).

== International scale ==
ISO 14688-1:2017 establishes the basic principles for identifying and classifying soils based on those material and mass characteristics most commonly used for soils for engineering purposes. ISO 14688-1 applies to natural soils in situ, similar man-made materials in situ and soils redeposited by people.

ISO 14688-1:2017
Name				Size range (mm)	Size range (approx. in)
Very coarse soil		Large boulder	lBo	>630	>24.8031
Very coarse soil		Boulder	Bo	200–630	7.8740–24.803
Very coarse soil		Cobble	Co	63–200	2.4803–7.8740
Coarse soil	Gravel	Coarse gravel	cGr	20–63	0.78740–2.4803
Coarse soil	Gravel	Medium gravel	mGr	6.3–20	0.24803–0.78740
Coarse soil	Gravel	Fine gravel	fGr	2.0–6.3	0.078740–0.24803
Coarse soil	Sand	Coarse sand	cSa	0.63–2.0	0.024803–0.078740
Coarse soil	Sand	Medium sand	mSa	0.2–0.63	0.0078740–0.024803
Coarse soil	Sand	Fine sand	fSa	0.063–0.2	0.0024803–0.0078740
Fine soil	Silt	Coarse silt	cSi	0.02–0.063	0.00078740–0.0024803
Fine soil	Silt	Medium silt	mSi	0.0063–0.02	0.00024803–0.00078740
Fine soil	Silt	Fine silt	fSi	0.002–0.0063	0.000078740–0.00024803
Fine soil	Clay		Cl	≤0.002	≤0.000078740

== Sorting ==
An accumulation of sediment can also be characterized by the grain size distribution. A sediment deposit can undergo sorting when a particle size range is removed by an agency such as a river or the wind. The sorting can be quantified using the Inclusive Graphic Standard Deviation:

$$\sigma_I=\frac{\phi 84 - \phi 16}{4} + \frac{\phi 95 - \phi 5}{6.6}$$

where

$\sigma_I$ is the Inclusive Graphic Standard Deviation in phi units
$\phi 84$ is the 84th percentile of the grain size distribution in phi units, etc.

The result of this can be described using the following terms:

Diameter (phi units)	Description
$\sigma_I$ < 0.35	very well sorted
0.35 < $\sigma_I$ < 0.50	well sorted
0.50 < $\sigma_I$ < 1.00	moderately sorted
1.00 < $\sigma_I$ < 2.00	poorly sorted
2.00 < $\sigma_I$ < 4.00	very poorly sorted
4.00 < $\sigma_I$	extremely poorly sorted

== See also ==
- Deposition (geology)
- Feret diameter
- Martin diameter
- Orders of magnitude (volume)
- Soil texture
- Substrate (biology)
- Unified Soil Classification System (USCS)
