= Sauter mean diameter =

Average measure of particle size

In fluid dynamics, Sauter mean diameter (SMD) is an average measure of particle size. It was originally developed by German scientist Josef Sauter in the late 1920s. It is defined as the diameter of a sphere that has the same volume/surface area ratio as a particle of interest. Several methods have been devised to obtain a good estimate of the SMD.

== Definition ==
The Sauter diameter (SD, also denoted D[3,2] or d_{32}) for a given particle is defined as:

$$SD = \frac{d_v^3}{d_s^2}$$

where d_{s} is the so-called surface diameter and d_{v} is the volume diameter, defined as:

$$d_s = \sqrt{\frac{A_p}{\pi}}$$

$$d_v = \left(\frac{6 V_p}{\pi}\right)^{1/3},$$

The quantities A_{p} and V_{p} are the ordinary surface area and volume of the particle, respectively.

The equation may be simplified further as:

$$SD = 6\frac{V_p}{A_p}.$$

This is usually taken as the mean of several measurements n, to obtain the Sauter mean diameter (SMD):

$$SMD = \sum_i^n SD_i / n$$

This provides intrinsic data that help determine the particle size for fluid problems.

== Applications ==
The SMD can be defined as the diameter of a drop having the same volume/surface area ratio as the entire spray.

SMD is especially important in calculations where the active surface area is important. Such areas include catalysis and applications in fuel combustion.

== See also ==
- Sphericity
