= Particle size =

Notion for comparing dimensions of particles in different states of matter

Granulometry
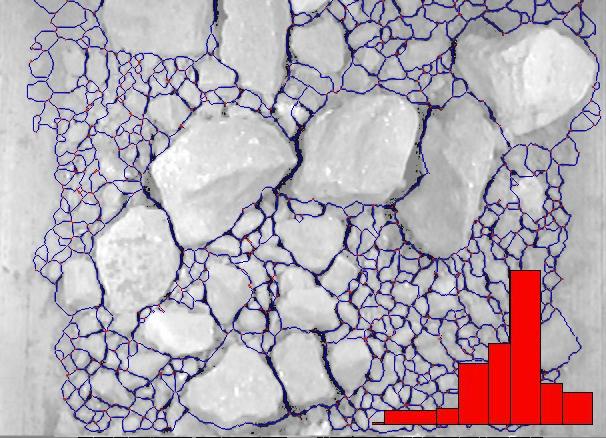

Basic concepts
- Particle size, Grain size, Size distribution, Morphology

Methods and techniques
- Mesh scale, Optical granulometry, Sieve analysis, Soil gradation

Related concepts
- Granulation, Granular material, Mineral dust, Pattern recognition, Dynamic light scattering

Particle size is a notion introduced for comparing dimensions of solid particles (flecks), liquid particles (droplets), or gaseous particles (bubbles). The notion of particle size applies to particles in colloids, in ecology, in granular material (whether airborne or not), and to particles that form a granular material (see also grain size).

== Measurement ==
There are several methods for measuring particle size and particle size distribution. Some of them are based on light, other on ultrasound, or electric field, or gravity, or centrifugation. The use of sieves is a common measurement technique, however this process can be more susceptible to human error and is time consuming. Technology such as dynamic image analysis (DIA) can make particle size distribution analyses much easier. This approach can be seen in instruments like Retsch Technology's CAMSIZER or the Sympatec QICPIC series of instruments. They still lack the capability of inline measurements for real time monitoring in production environments. Therefore, inline imaging devices like the SOPAT system are most efficient.

Machine learning algorithms are used to increase the performance of particle size measurement. This line of research can yield low-cost and real time particle size analysis.

In all methods the size is an indirect measure, obtained by a model that transforms, in abstract way, the real particle shape into a simple and standardized shape, like a sphere (the most usual) or a cuboid (when minimum bounding box is used), where the size parameter (ex. diameter of sphere) makes sense. Exception is the mathematical morphology approach, where no shape hypothesis is necessary.

Definition of the particle size for an ensemble (collection) of particles presents another problem. Real systems are practically always polydisperse, which means that the particles in an ensemble have different sizes. The notion of particle size distribution reflects this polydispersity. There is often a need for a certain average particle size for the ensemble of particles.

=== Expressions for sphere size ===
The particle size of a spherical object can be unambiguously and quantitatively defined by its diameter. However, a typical material object is likely to be irregular in shape and non-spherical. The above quantitative definition of particle size cannot be applied to non-spherical particles. There are several ways of extending the above quantitative definition to apply to non-spherical particles. Existing definitions are based on replacing a given particle with an imaginary sphere that has one of the properties identical with the particle.

Volume-based particle size
Volume-based particle size equals the diameter of the sphere that has the same volume as a given particle. Typically used in sieve analysis, as shape hypothesis (sieve's mesh size as the sphere diameter).

$$D = 2 \sqrt[3] {\frac{3V}{4\pi}}$$
where

$D$: diameter of representative sphere
$V$: volume of particle

Area-based particle size
Area-based particle size equals the diameter of the sphere that has the same surface area as a given particle. Typically used in optical granulometry techniques.

$$D = \sqrt[2] {\frac{4A}{\pi}}$$
where

$D$: diameter of representative sphere
$A$: surface area of particle

=== Indirect measure expressions ===
In some measures the size (a length dimension in the expression) can't be obtained, only calculated as a function of another dimensions and parameters. Illustrating below by the main cases.

Weight-based (spheroidal) particle size
Weight-based particle size equals the diameter of the sphere that has the same weight as a given particle. Useful as hypothesis in centrifugation and decantation, or when the number of particles can be estimated (to obtain average particle's weight as sample weight divided by the number of particles in the sample). This formula is only valid when all particles have the same density.

$$D = 2 \sqrt[3] {\frac{3W}{4\pi dg}}$$
where

$D$: diameter of representative sphere
$W$: weight of particle
$d$: density of particle
$g$: gravitational constant

Aerodynamic particle size
Hydrodynamic or aerodynamic particle size equals the diameter of the sphere that has the same drag coefficient as a given particle.
Another complexity in defining particle size in a fluid medium appears for particles with sizes below a micrometre. When a particle becomes that small, the thickness of the interface layer becomes comparable with the particle size. As a result, the position of the particle surface becomes uncertain. There is a convention for placing this imaginary surface at a certain position suggested by Gibbs and presented in many books on interface and colloid science.

== International conventions ==
There is an international standard on presenting various characteristic particle sizes, the ISO 9276 (Representation of results of particle size analysis). This set of various average sizes includes median size, geometric mean size, average size. In the selection of specific small-size particles is common the use of ISO 565 and ISO 3310-1 to the choice of mesh size.

=== Colloidal particle ===
In materials science and colloidal chemistry, the term colloidal particle refers to a small amount of matter having a size typical for colloids and with a clear phase boundary. The dispersed-phase particles have a diameter between approximately 1 and 1000 nanometers. Colloids are heterogeneous in nature, invisible to the naked eye, and always move in a random zig-zag-like motion known as Brownian motion. The scattering of light by colloidal particles is known as Tyndall effect.

== See also ==
- Dynamic light scattering
- Grain size
- Laser diffraction analysis
- Micromeritics
- Dispersion Technology
- Sauter mean diameter
