= Gel permeation chromatography =

Type of size-exclusion chromatography

Gel permeation chromatography (GPC) is a type of size-exclusion chromatography (SEC), that separates high molecular weight or colloidal analytes on the basis of size or diameter, typically in organic solvents. The technique is often used for the analysis of polymers. As a technique, SEC was first developed in 1955 by Lathe and Ruthven. The term gel permeation chromatography can be traced back to J.C. Moore of the Dow Chemical Company who investigated the technique in 1964. The proprietary column technology was licensed to Waters Corporation, who subsequently commercialized this technology in 1964. GPC systems and consumables are now also available from a number of manufacturers. It is often necessary to separate polymers, both to analyze them as well as to purify the desired product.

When characterizing polymers, it is important to consider their size distribution and dispersity (Đ) as well their molecular weight. Polymers can be characterized by a variety of definitions for molecular weight including the number average molecular weight (M_{n}), the weight average molecular weight (M_{w}) (see molar mass distribution), the size average molecular weight (M_{z}), or the viscosity molecular weight (M_{v}). GPC allows for the determination of Đ as well as M_{v} and, based on other data, the M_{n}, M_{w}, and M_{z} can be determined.

== How it works ==
GPC is a type of chromatography in which analytes are separated, based on their size or hydrodynamic volume (radius of gyration). This differs from other chromatographic techniques, which depend upon chemical or physical interactions between the mobile and stationary phases to separate analytes. Separation occurs via the use of porous gel beads packed inside a column (see stationary phase (chemistry)). The principle of separation relies on the differential exclusion or inclusion of the macromolecules by the porous gel stationary phase. Larger molecules are excluded from entering the pores and elute earlier, while smaller molecules can enter the pores, thus staying longer inside the column. The entire process takes place without any interaction of the analytes with the surface of the stationary phase.

Schematic of pore vs analyte size

The smaller analytes relative to the pore sizes can permeate these pores and spend more time inside the gel particles, increasing their retention time. Conversely, larger analytes relative to the pores sizes spend little if any time inside the column, hence they elute sooner. Each type of column has a range of molecular weights that can be separated, according to their pores sizes.

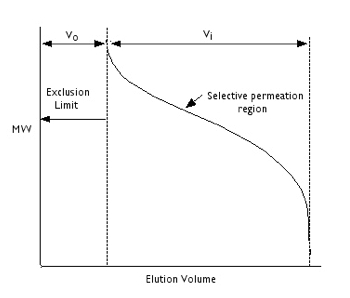
Range of molecular weights that can be separated for each packing material

If an analyte is too large relative to the column's pores, it will not be retained at all and will be totally excluded; conversely, if the analyte is small relative to the pores sizes, it will be totally permeating. Analytes that are totally excluded, elute with the free volume outside around the particles (V_{o}), the total exclusion limit, while analytes that are completely delayed, elute with the solvent, marking the total permeation volume of the column, including also the solvent held inside the pores (V_{i}). The total volume can be considered by the following equation, where V_{g} is the volume of the polymer gel and V_{t} is the total volume: $V_t=V_g+V_i+V_o$

As can be inferred, there is a limited range of molecular weights that can be separated by each column, therefore the size of the pores for the packing should be chosen according to the range of molecular weight of analytes to be separated. For polymer separations the pore sizes should be on the order of the polymers being analyzed. If a sample has a broad molecular weight range it may be necessary to use several GPC columns with varying pores volumes in tandem to resolve the sample fully.

== Application ==
GPC is often used to determine the relative molecular weight of polymer samples as well as the distribution of molecular weights. What GPC truly measures is the molecular volume and shape function as defined by the intrinsic viscosity. If comparable standards are used, this relative data can be used to determine molecular weights within ± 5% accuracy. Polystyrene standards with dispersities of less than 1.2 are typically used to calibrate the GPC. Unfortunately, polystyrene tends to be a very linear polymer and therefore as a standard it is only useful to compare it to other polymers that are known to be linear and of relatively the same size.

== Material and methods ==
=== Instrumentation ===
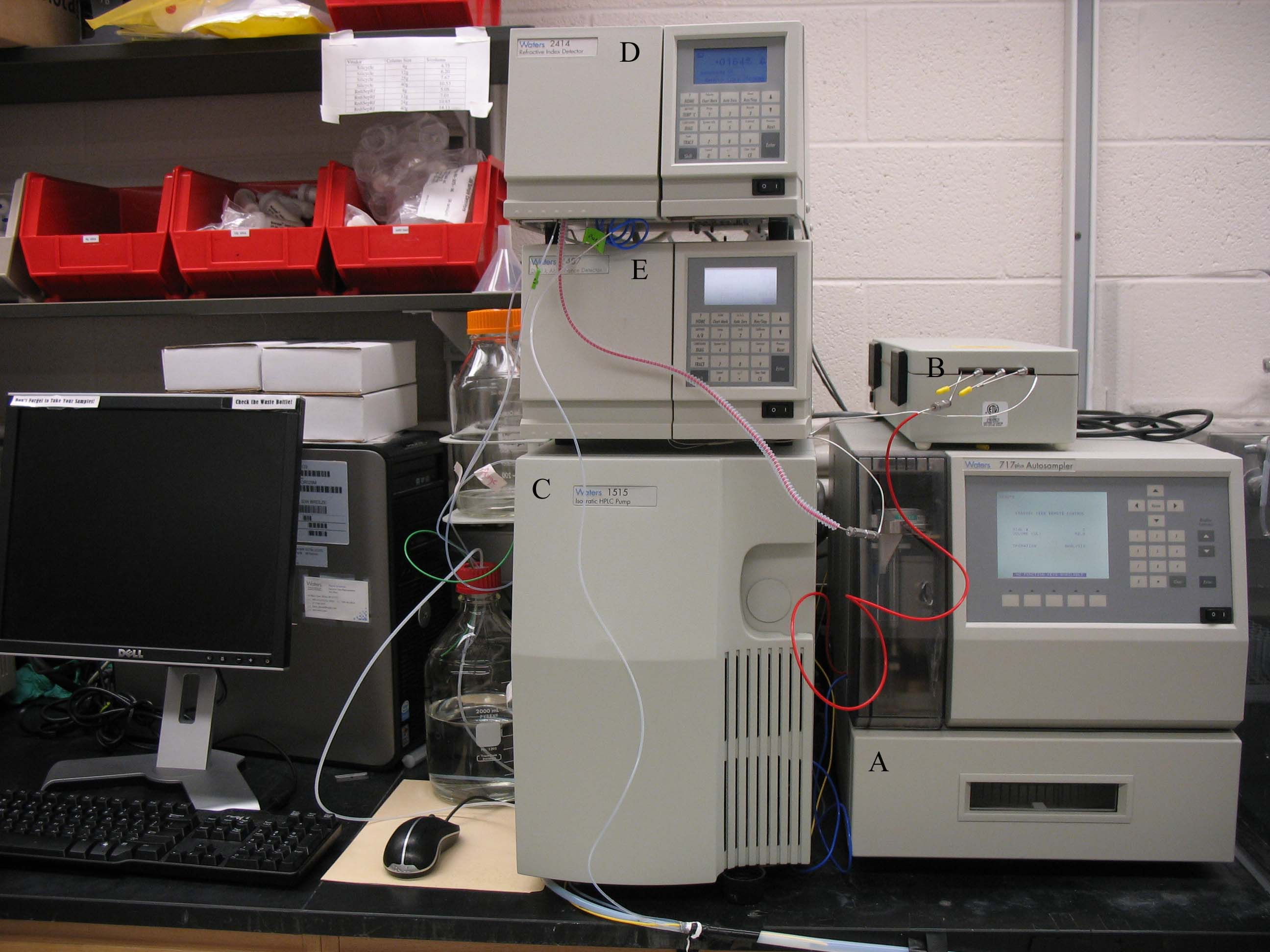
A typical GPC instrument including: A. Autosampler, B. Column, C. Pump, D. RI detector, E. UV-vis detector

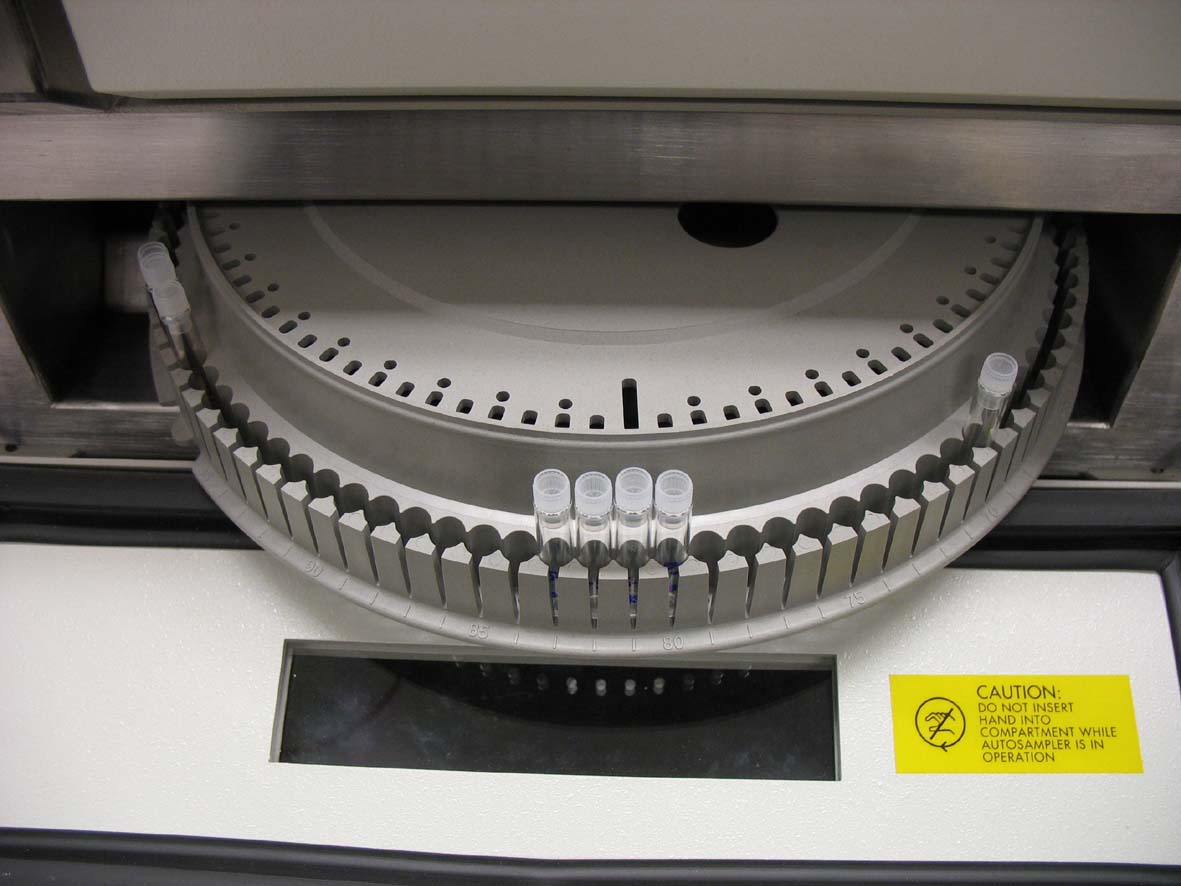
Inside of an autosampler for running several samples without user interaction, e.g. overnight

Gel permeation chromatography is conducted almost exclusively in chromatography systems. The experimental design is not much different from other techniques of High Performance liquid chromatography. Samples are dissolved in an appropriate solvent, in the case of GPC these tend to be organic solvents and after filtering the solution it is injected onto a column. The separation of multi-component mixture takes place in the column. The constant supply of fresh eluent to the column is accomplished by the use of a pump. Since most analytes are not visible to the naked eye a detector is needed. Often multiple detectors are used to gain additional information about the polymer sample. The availability of a detector makes the fractionation convenient and accurate.

=== Gel ===
Gels are used as stationary phase for GPC. The pore size of a gel must be carefully controlled in order to be able to apply the gel to a given separation. Other desirable properties of the gel forming agent are the absence of ionizing groups and, in a given solvent, low affinity for the substances to be separated. Commercial gels like PLgel & Styragel (cross-linked polystyrene-divinylbenzene), LH-20 (hydroxypropylated Sephadex), Bio-Gel (cross-linked polyacrylamide), HW-20 & HW-40 (hydroxylated methacrylic polymer), and agarose gel are often used based on different separation requirements.

=== Column ===
The column used for GPC is filled with a microporous packing material. The column is filled with the gel. Since the total penetration volume is the maximum volume permeated by the analytes, and there is no retention on the surface of the stationary phase, the total column volume is usually large, relatively to the sample volume.

=== Eluent ===
The eluent (mobile phase) should be the appropriate solvent to dissolve the polymer, should not interfere with the response of the polymer analyzed, and should wet the packing surface and make it inert to interactions with the polymers. The most common eluents for polymers that dissolve at room temperature GPC are tetrahydrofuran (THF), o-dichlorobenzene and trichlorobenzene at 130–150 °C for crystalline polyalkynes and hexafluoroisopropanol (HFIP) for crystalline condensation polymers such as polyamides and polyesters.

=== Pump ===
There are two types of pumps available for uniform delivery of relatively small liquid volumes for GPC: piston or peristaltic pumps. The delivery of a constant flow free of fluctuations is especially important to the precision of the GPC analysis, as the flow-rate is used for the calibration of the molecular weight, or diameter.

=== Detector ===
In GPC, the concentration by weight of polymer in the eluting solvent may be monitored continuously with a detector. There are many detector types available and they can be divided into two main categories. The first is concentration sensitive detectors which includes UV-VIS absorption, differential refractometer (DRI) or refractive index (RI) detectors, infrared (IR) absorption and density detectors. The second category is molecular weight sensitive detectors, which include low angle light scattering detectors (LALLS) and multi angle light scattering (MALS). The resulting chromatogram is therefore a weight distribution of the polymer as a function of retention volume.

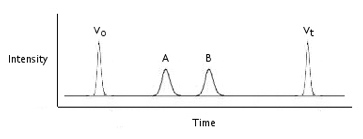
GPC chromatogram; V_{o}= no retention, V_{t}= complete retention, A and B = partial retention

The most sensitive detector is the differential UV photometer and the most common detector is the differential refractometer (DRI). When characterizing copolymer, it is necessary to have two detectors in series. For accurate determinations of copolymer composition at least two of those detectors should be concentration detectors. The determination of most copolymer compositions is done using UV and RI detectors, although other combinations can be used.

== Data analysis ==
Gel permeation chromatography (GPC) has become the most widely used technique for analyzing polymer samples in order to determine their molecular weights and weight distributions. Examples of GPC chromatograms of polystyrene samples with their molecular weights and dispersities are shown on the left.

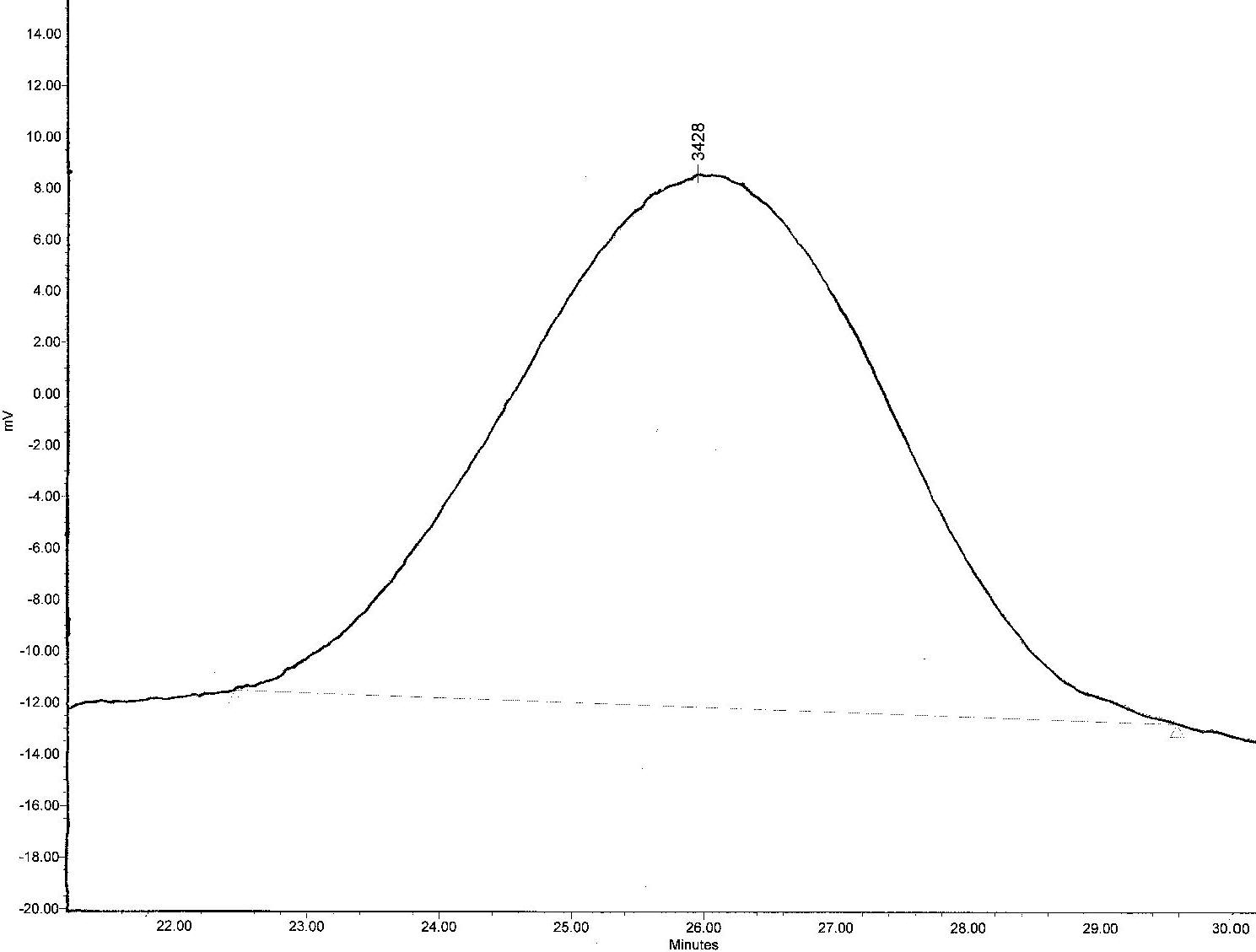
GPC Separation of Anionically Synthesized Polystyrene; M_{n}=3,000 g/mol, Đ=1.32

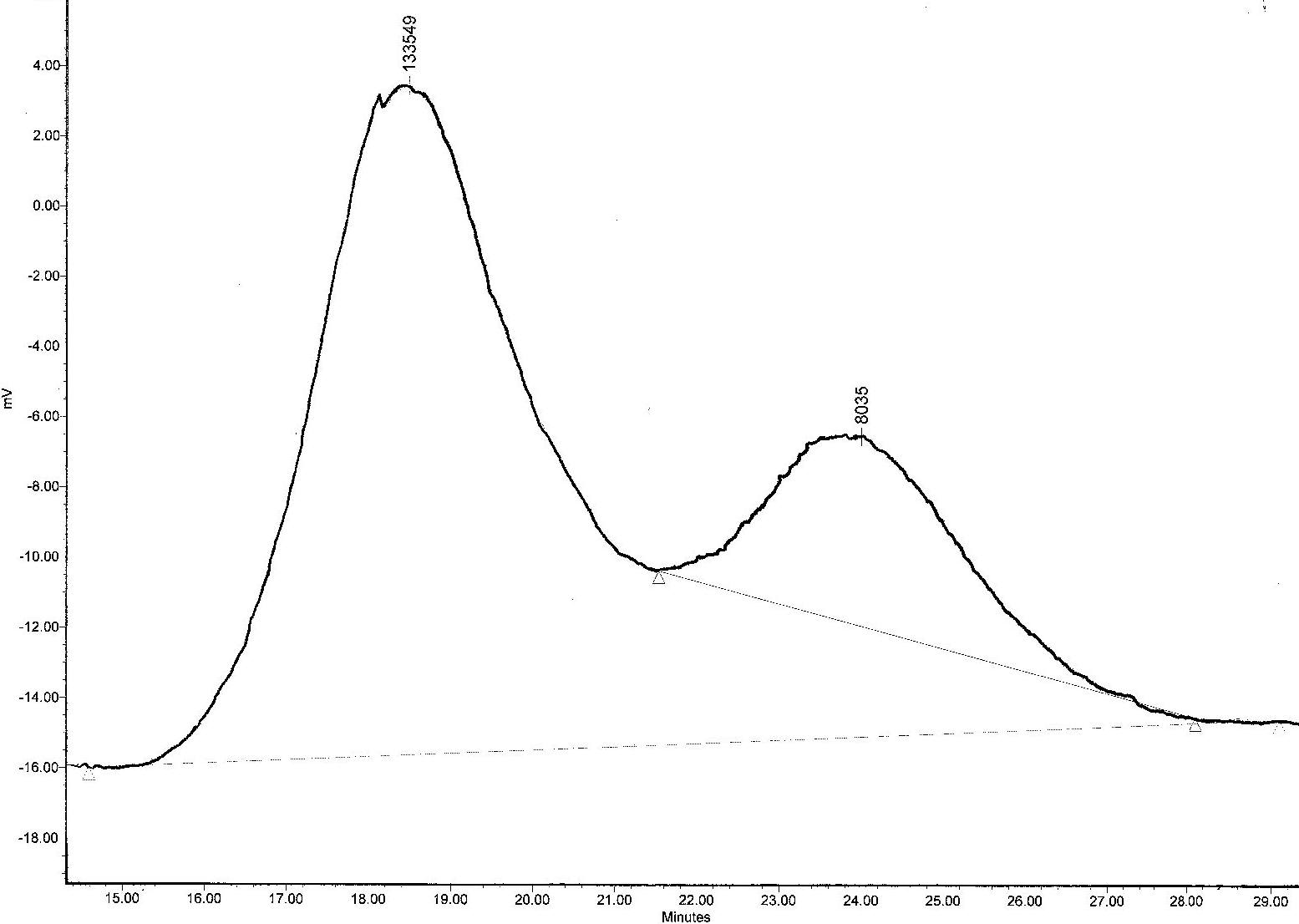
GPC Separation of Free-Radical Synthesized Polystyrene; M_{n}=24,000 g/mol, Đ=4.96

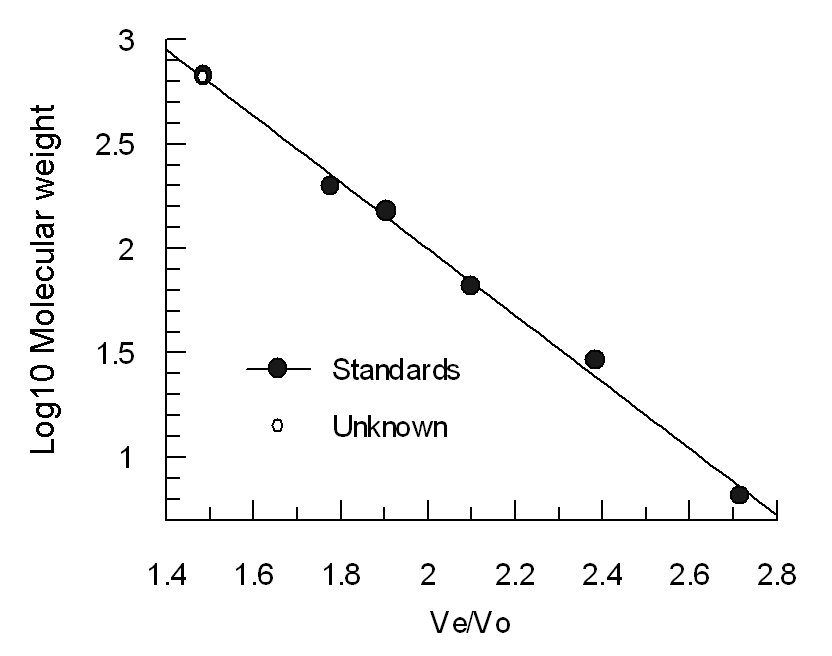
Standardization (calibration) of a size-exclusion column

Benoit and co-workers proposed that the hydrodynamic volume, V_{η}, which is proportional to the product of [η] and M, where [η] is the intrinsic viscosity of the polymer in the SEC eluent, may be used as the universal calibration parameter. If the Mark–Houwink–Sakurada constants K and α are known (see Mark–Houwink equation), a plot of log [η]M versus elution volume (or elution time) for a particular solvent, column and instrument provides a universal calibration curve which can be used for any polymer in that solvent. By determining the retention volumes (or times) of monodisperse polymer standards (e.g. solutions of monodispersed polystyrene in THF), a calibration curve can be obtained by plotting the logarithm of the molecular weight versus the retention time or volume. Once the calibration curve is obtained, the gel permeation chromatogram of any other polymer can be obtained in the same solvent and the molecular weights (usually M_{n} and M_{w}) and the complete molecular weight distribution for the polymer can be determined. A typical calibration curve is shown to the right and the molecular weight from an unknown sample can be obtained from the calibration curve.

== Advantages ==
As a separation technique, GPC has many advantages. First of all, it has a well-defined separation time due to the fact that there is a final elution volume for all unretained analytes. Additionally, GPC can provide narrow bands, although this aspect of GPC is more difficult for polymer samples that have broad ranges of molecular weights present. Finally, since the analytes do not interact chemically or physically with the column, there is a lower chance for analyte loss to occur. For investigating the properties of polymer samples in particular, GPC can be very advantageous. GPC provides a more convenient method of determining the molecular weights of polymers. In fact most samples can be thoroughly analyzed in an hour or less. Other methods used in the past were fractional extraction and fractional precipitation. As these processes were quite labor-intensive molecular weights and mass distributions typically were not analyzed. Therefore, GPC has allowed for the quick and relatively easy estimation of molecular weights and distribution for polymer samples

== Disadvantages ==
There are disadvantages to GPC, however. First, there is a limited number of peaks that can be resolved within the short time scale of the GPC run. Also, as a technique GPC requires around at least a 10% difference in molecular weight for a reasonable resolution of peaks to occur. In regards to polymers, the molecular masses of most of the chains will be too close for the GPC separation to show anything more than broad peaks. Another disadvantage of GPC for polymers is that filtrations must be performed before using the instrument to prevent dust and other particulates from ruining the columns and interfering with the detectors. Although useful for protecting the instrument, there is the possibility of the pre-filtration of the sample removing higher molecular weight sample before it can be loaded on the column. Another possibility to overcome these issues is the separation by field-flow fractionation (FFF).

== Orthogonal methods ==
Field-flow fractionation (FFF) can be considered as an alternative to GPC, especially when particles or high molar mass polymers cause clogging of the column, shear degradation is an issue or agglomeration takes place but cannot be made visible. FFF is separation in an open flow channel without having a static phase involved so no interactions occur. With one field-flow fractionation version, thermal field-flow fractionation, separation of polymers having the same size but different chemical compositions is possible.
