= Absolute molar mass =

Absolute molar mass is the molar mass of a molecule, typically a protein or polymer, that is calibrant-independent, which are typically determined through size exclusion chromatography and light scattering.

== Measurement ==
The most widely used method to determine absolute molar mass is size-exclusion chromatography (SEC) coupled with multi-angle laser light scattering (MALS). SEC can separate macromolecules based on their size by passing an analyte containing molecules of different sizes through a column containing porous substrate. Larger components of the analyte spend less time traveling through these pores and therefore elute faster, while smaller components can access more of these pores and are therefore retained longer. However, molar masses determined through SEC require calibration curves constructed from standards, and calculating absolute molar masses require absolute detection systems.

The two primary detection systems used to determine absolute molar mass are light scattering photometers and viscometers. Static light scattering (SLS) experiments measure the difference between the light scattered by a dilute solution and the light scattered through pure solvent. Given a dilute enough solution and at an angle of θ = 0° between the incident light and the scattering direction, this difference, known as the excess Rayleigh ratio ΔR(θ), can be approximately related to the weight-average molar mass M_{w} through the equation:

$\frac{\Delta R(\theta)}{Kc}\approx M_w$

where K is an optical constant and c is the solution concentration. Using a differential refractometer (DRI) to measure the concentration of the solution, an absolute molar mass can be calculated.

More accurate measurements can be made by using a low-angle static light scattering (LALS) detector, which operates at a very low angle and therefore do not require angular effects to be corrected. However, these detectors are very sensitive to particles, which leads to noisy data and are therefore rarely used. LALS detectors have largely been replaced by MALS detectors, which measures scattered light at multiple angles simultaneously and extrapolates the data to θ = 0° to obtain a weight-average molar mass. The coupling of SEC with MALS detection have become the benchmark for the determination of absolute molecular mass, particularly averages masses and distributions.

Viscometry detectors, although less common, also function as detectors of absolute molar mass. Unlike light scattering photometers which do not use a calibration curve, viscometers apply a universal calibration curve where the logarithm of intrinsic viscosity multiplied by molar mass can be plotted against the retention volume from SEC. This method is effective for calculating the absolute molar mass of a wide variety of polymers, including rod-like polymers and dendrimers.

Several other methods of analysis are used to determine the absolute molar mass. Membrane osmometry is a method that relates the osmotic pressure of a solution to its number-average molar mass, but is less effective in species that can permeate the membrane. Additionally, the absolute molar mass can be determined using sedimentation equilibrium experiments or using independently determined sedimentation and diffusion coefficients. Other methods replace SEC with different separation techniques such as asymmetric flow field flow fractionation (AF4) or involve different detection systems such as matrix assisted laser desorption/ionization-time of flight-mass spectrometry (MALDI-TOF-MS).
