= Polymer fractionation =

Targeted manipulation of molecular weight distribution

Polymers are chainlike molecules that are made of the same repetition unit. With a few exceptions such as proteins, a polymer consists of a mix of molecules with different chain lengths. Therefore, average values are given for the molecular weight like the number average, the weight average or the viscosity average molar mass. A measure for the width of the molecular weight distribution is the polydispersity index. The targeted manipulation of the molecular weight distribution of a polymer by removing short and/or long chain material is called polymer fractionation.

== Reasons for polymer fractionation ==
The molecular weight of polymers has a large influence on their properties and therefore determines the applications. Among others the flow behavior, the solubility, the mechanical properties but also the lifetime are influenced by the molecular weight. For high duty polymers – polymers that have to fulfill elevated demands – not only the molecular weight but also the molecular weight distribution is important. This especially holds true if low and/or high molecular material disturbs a given task.

== Analytical methods ==
Polymers can be fractionated on an analytical scale by size exclusion chromatography (SEC), Matrix-assisted laser desorption/ionization (MALDI) or field flow fractionation (FFF). These methods are used to determine the molecular weight distribution.

== Preparative methods ==
In most cases the fractionation of polymers on a preparative scale is based on chromatographic methods (e.g. preparative SEC or Baker-Williams fractionation). Therefore, the production is normally limited to few grams only. For large scales of several grams up to kg or even tons the “continuous spin fractionation” can be used. F. Francuskiewicz gives an overview about preparative polymer fractionation.

== Literature ==
- M.J.R Cantow Polymer Fractionation Academic Press, New York (1967)
- L.H. Tung Fractionation of Synthetic Polymers Marcel Dekker, New York (1977)
- F. Francuskiewicz Polymer Fractionation Springer, Berlin (1994)
- R. Koningsveld, L.D. Kleintjens, H. Geerissen, P. Schützeichel, B.A. Wolf „Fractionation“ in: Comprehensive Polymer Science Volume 1 Pergamon Press, Oxford (1989) 293-312
