= Microfluidic diffusional sizing =

Method of measuring particle size

Microfluidic diffusional sizing (MDS) is a method to measure the size of particles based on the degree to which they diffuse within a microfluidic laminar flow. It allows size measurements to be taken from extremely small quantities of material (nano-grams) and is particularly useful when sizing molecules which may vary in size depending on their environment - e.g. protein molecules which may unfold or become denatured in unfavourable conditions.

== Applications ==
MDS is primarily used in protein analyses, where size, concentration and interactions are important.

=== Protein size measurement ===
Measuring the size of a protein molecule is useful as an overall quality indicator, since misfolding, unfolding, oligomerization, aggregation or degradation can all affect size.

The literature specifically demonstrates the use of MDS in sizing protein-nanobody complexes, monitoring the formation of α-synuclein amyloid fibrils. and in observing protein assembly into oligomers

MDS can also be used to size membrane proteins, as the use of a protein specific labelling and detection system allows other species present in the solution (such as free lipid micelles or detergents) to be ignored.

=== Protein interactions ===
MDS has been used to characterise interactions between biomolecules under native conditions, and has been demonstrated to detect specific interactions within complex mixtures. It has also been used in detecting and quantifying protein-ligand interactions and protein-lipid interactions.

=== Protein concentration ===
The concentration of purified protein solutions in the laboratory is useful in determining yield and measuring the success of a prep. MDS reports concentration as well as size for each test.

Since the detection is not based on inherent fluorescence of tryptophan or tyrosine residues, MDS has been used as an alternative to A280 UV-Vis quantification.

== Advantages ==
If protein specific labelling is applied, MDS allows membrane proteins to be sized. This is particularly useful as it is an area where other biophysical techniques can struggle - for example dynamic light scattering (DLS) is of limited use, since free detergent molecules may also scatter light and affect the results.

Furthermore, as the size reported is an average of all detectable species present there is no bias towards large species, as is found in DLS measurements.

Another key advantage is that results can be obtained with very small quantities of material which may be particularly important where samples are scarce or expensive.

With commercially available MDS instruments, testing is very simple and there is no need to input test parameters or sample conditions. This makes it a very repeatable method of testing as most of the functions such as flow rates, detector settings etc. are automated by the instrument rather than set by the operator.

In addition to size, MDS is able to calculate concentration so two parameters can be assessed in one test.

Finally the method does not require calibration, as it relies on a ratio-metric measurement to determine diffusion rate.

== Theory ==
In an MDS analysis, a stream of liquid containing the particles to be sized is introduced alongside an auxiliary stream in a laminar flow in a microfluidic channel. Because there is no convective mixing of the two streams, the only way particles can move to the auxiliary stream is by diffusion. The rate of this diffusion is dependent on the particle's size, as determined by the Stokes–Einstein equation, so small particles diffuse quicker than large particles.

After a period of diffusion the original and auxiliary streams are split and the degree of diffusion is fixed. The number of particles in each stream can then be detected (in the case of proteins this is achieved by addition of an amine reactive fluorogenic dye). The ratio between the two streams is used to determine the diffusion co-efficient, which is used to calculate the hydrodynamic radius. The sum of particles in both streams can also be used to measure the concentration of the analyte.
