= Mark–Houwink equation =

Equation in polymer science

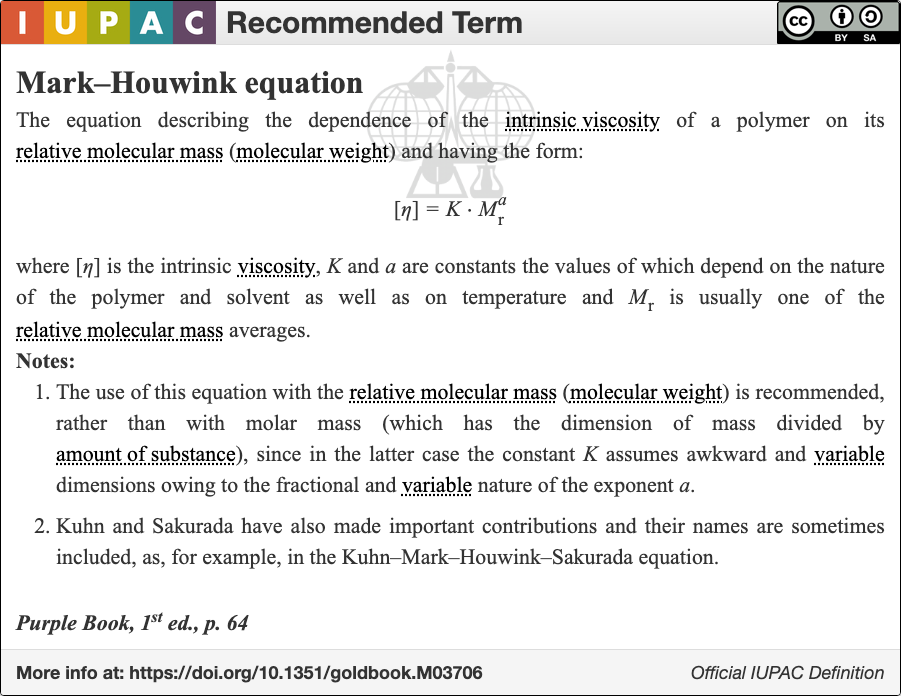
IUPAC definition for the Mark–Houwink equation

The Mark–Houwink equation, also known as the Mark–Houwink–Sakurada equation or the Kuhn–Mark–Houwink–Sakurada equation, gives a relation between intrinsic viscosity $[\eta]$ and molecular weight $M$:

$$[\eta]=KM^a$$

From this equation the molecular weight of a polymer can be determined from data on the intrinsic viscosity and vice versa.

The equation often receives the name of its contributors Herman F. Mark, Roelof Houwink, Ichirō Sakurada, and Werner and Hans Kuhn (unrelated), who developed it in the 1940s.

== Parameter values ==
The values of the Mark–Houwink parameters, $a$ and $K$, depend on the particular polymer-solvent system as well as temperature.

$a$ is related to the polymer's hydrodynamic volume, and thus the solvated polymer's typical geometry. If the radius of gyration, $R$, scales with mass as $R\sim M^\nu$, then $a=3\nu-1$. Thus:

- $a=0$ implies that the polymer is a rigid sphere, such as the DNA of bacteriophage T2
- $a=0.5$ corresponds to the flexible coil induced by a theta solvent
- $a=0.76$ corresponds to a good solvent described by Flory-Huggins solution theory.
- $a=2.0$ implies that the polymer is an absolutely rigid rod, such as tobacco mosaic virus.

Other $a$ values generally hold for small ranges of molar masses and exhibit a nonlinear log-log plot, because they correspond to transitions between each dynamical regime. Nevertheless, flexible polymers are defined as those for which $0.5\leq a\leq 0.8$ and semi-flexible polymers those for which $a\ge 0.8$.

== Applications ==
The Mark–Houwink equation can be used in size-exclusion chromatography (SEC)/gel permeation chromatography (GPC) to construct the so called universal calibration curve which can be used to determine the molecular weight of a polymer A using a calibration done with polymer B.

In SEC molecules are separated based on hydrodynamic volume, i.e. the size of the coil a given polymer forms in solution. The hydrodynamic volume, however, cannot simply be related to molecular weight (imagine eg. the coiling of comb-like polystyrene vs. linear polystyrene). This means that the molecular weight associated with a given retention time/volume is substance specific and that in order to determine the molecular weight of a given polymer a molecular-weight size marker of the same substance must be available. However, the product of the intrinsic viscosity and the molecular weight, $[\eta]M$, is proportional to the hydrodynamic radius and therefore independent of substance. It follows that

$$[\eta]_AM_A=[\eta]_BM_B$$

is true at any given retention volume/time. Substitution of $[\eta]$ using the Mark–Houwink equation gives:

$$K_AM_A^{a_A+1}=K_BM_B^{a_B+1}$$

which can be used to relate the molecular weight of any two polymers using their Mark–Houwink constants (i.e. "universally" applicable for calibration).

For example, if narrow molar mass distribution standards are available for polystyrene, these can be used to construct a calibration curve (typically $\log M$ vs. retention volume ) in eg. toluene at 40 °C. This calibration can then be used to determine the "polystyrene equivalent" molecular weight of eg. a polyethylene sample or any other polymer for which standards might not be available if the Mark–Houwink parameters for both substances are known in this solvent and at this temperature.
