= Wyatt Technology Corporation =

American technology company

- Trade name: Wyatt Technology
- Formerly: Science Spectrum, Inc. (predecessor)
- Type: Subsidiary
- Industry: Scientific instrumentation
- Predecessor: Science Spectrum, Inc.
- Incorporated: 1984
- Founded: 1981
- Founder: Philip J. Wyatt
- Fate: Acquired by Waters Corporation
- Headquarters: Santa Barbara, California, U.S.
- Key people: Philip J. Wyatt (Founder)
- Products: Instrumentation for nanoparticle and macromolecule characterization
- Brands: DAWN, Optilab, DynaPro
- Parent: Waters Corporation (since May 2023)
- Website: wyatt.com

Wyatt Technology Corporation, or Wyatt Technology, is a developer and manufacturer of instrumentation for the characterization of nanoparticles and macromolecules. Headquartered in Santa Barbara, California, Wyatt Technology was founded in 1981 and incorporated in 1984. It was acquired by Waters Corporation in 2023.

== History ==
=== Background and Science Spectrum ===
Wyatt Technology was created from founder Philip J. Wyatt’s earlier venture, Science Spectrum, Inc. (SSI), which was founded in 1968 to investigate the characterization of bacteria using light scattering. Wyatt used a breadboard instrument developed at SSI to confirm that light scattering could reveal bacterial effects that are not observable with a microscope. Further studies explored the efficacy of antibiotic agents on bacteria. A commercial instrument, the Differential I, was ultimately developed, in an attempt to provide convenient and accurate data while still maintaining flexibility necessary in exploring this new field. In order to better test antibiotic susceptibility, SSI developed the Differential III which was one of the first analytical instruments to incorporate an onboard computer and utilized the first batch run of Intel’s 8008 chips. Although SSI attracted several clients and was awarded several US government contracts, cash flow problems ultimately led to its collapse.

=== Light scattering articles (1981-1982) ===
As he wrapped up the business of SSI, in 1981 Wyatt published a letter in Science recounting light scattering patterns of various wines analyzed with the Differential III. The paper correlated the scattering patterns to price and the opinions of the quality of the wine by a panel of local wine enthusiasts. This article drew national attention from various media outlets, including Science News and the New York Daily News. Wyatt followed up with a paper in Applied Optics entitled “A Taste of Things to Come,” where he reported similar studies on cola drinks such as Coca-Cola, Pepsi Cola and RC Cola. The interest in laser fingerprinting of beverages even attracted the attention of author Isaac Asimov, whose article “No Accounting” explained how Wyatt's light scattering experiments worked.

In 1983 Ballard Canyon Winery, located in Solvang, California, produced a “Laser Certified” cabernet sauvignon. The label displayed a laser fingerprint and values including a Body score of 447 and a Structure of 218, and stated, “We believe this unique laser fingerprint will provide a reference standard of this fine wine for many years to come and permit, thereby, an objective comparison with other vintages.”

=== Wyatt Technology formation (1981) ===
Wyatt formed Wyatt Technology Company in 1981 in order to wrap up uncompleted government research contracts, as interest in his Science letter continued. National interest in wine fingerprinting and media reports on the cola studies published in Applied Optics ultimately garnered the attention of the Coca-Cola Company, who gave Wyatt Technology Company a contract to study various attributes pertaining to their beverages. The wine studies also caught the attention of S.C. Johnson & Son, who requested an instrument to study the light scattering properties of their wax particles.

=== New instrumentation and expansion (1980s-2000s) ===
Upon founding, Wyatt Technology developed the first in its line of DAWN (originally an acronym for “Dual Angle Weighted Nephelometry”) multiangle light scattering instruments. Continuing interest in the DAWN instruments as well as Small Business Innovation Research (SBIR) contracts involving the rapid detection of contaminants in water and air spurred the growth of the company, which was incorporated as Wyatt Technology Corporation in 1984. Wyatt proceeded to develop batch light scattering instruments (DAWN-B) that made measurements from samples contained within scintillation vials as well as flow through instruments (DAWN-F) for use in conjunction with high performance liquid chromatography (HPLC).

In the late 1980s Wyatt purchased the Optilab line of interferometric refractometers from the Swedish company Tekator.

In the mid 1990s the burgeoning pharmaceutical industry showed interest in using DAWN instruments coupled with HPLC to measure the molecular weight of proteins, widening the scope of utility of Wyatt instruments which had, up to that time, been primarily used for the characterization of synthetic polymers.

In 2004 Wyatt Technology acquired the DynaPro line of dynamic light scattering instruments from bankrupt Proterion.

=== Sale to Waters Corporation (2023) ===
Waters Corporation, an American analytical laboratory instrument and software company, agreed to acquire Wyatt Technology for $1.36 billion in cash in February 2023. The acquisition completed in May 2023.

== Technology ==
Wyatt Technology has developed and introduced instrumentation for the measurement of multiangle light scattering (MALS), quasi-elastic light scattering (QELS) (also called photon correlation spectroscopy (PCS) or dynamic light scattering (DLS)), differential refractive index, electrophoresis, viscosity, and composition gradient multiangle light scattering (CG-MALS) for the determination of absolute molecular weights, sizes of nanoparticles, proteins, and polymers within a solution.

== Accolades ==
Wyatt Technology is largely notable as a SBIR success story. Begun primarily with SBIR grants, Wyatt Technology has grown to be the largest supplier of multiangle light scattering instruments in the world. Its instruments are used by about 30,000 scientists worldwide, data from the use of their instruments has been published in over 12,000 peer reviewed articles, and have been used in the research of several Nobel Laureates. Wyatt Technology, its founder, and its instruments have received many awards from the scientific and business communities, including the Tibbetts Award in 2011 in recognition visible technological impact on the socio-economic front. Winners of the “Tibbie” exemplify the very best in SBIR achievements. Founder, Philip Wyatt, was granted the American Physical Society’s prize for “Industrial Applications of Physics” for pioneering developments in the inverse scattering problem as well successful and sustained commercialization of analytical instrumentation. Wyatt Technology has been named one of the “Best Places to Work in Industry” by The Scientist magazine from 2008-2013. Wyatt Technology's Optilab rEX differential refractometer was awarded the 2004 Pittcon Editor's Silver award, and was also named, by R&D Magazine, one of the top 100 innovative new products of the year. At Pittcon in 2017 Wyatt's HELEOS II MALS detector won Select Science's Reviewers’ Choice Award for Instrument of the Year. In 2013 Wyatt's Optialb UT-rEX was awarded the Innovation Award by “The Analytical Scientist” magazine as was the μDAWN in 2014. Wyatt Technology has also been awarded several local business awards including the South Coast Business and Technology Award as “Company of the Year” in 2009 and the Spirit of Small Business award in 2004.
