= Günter Victor Schulz =

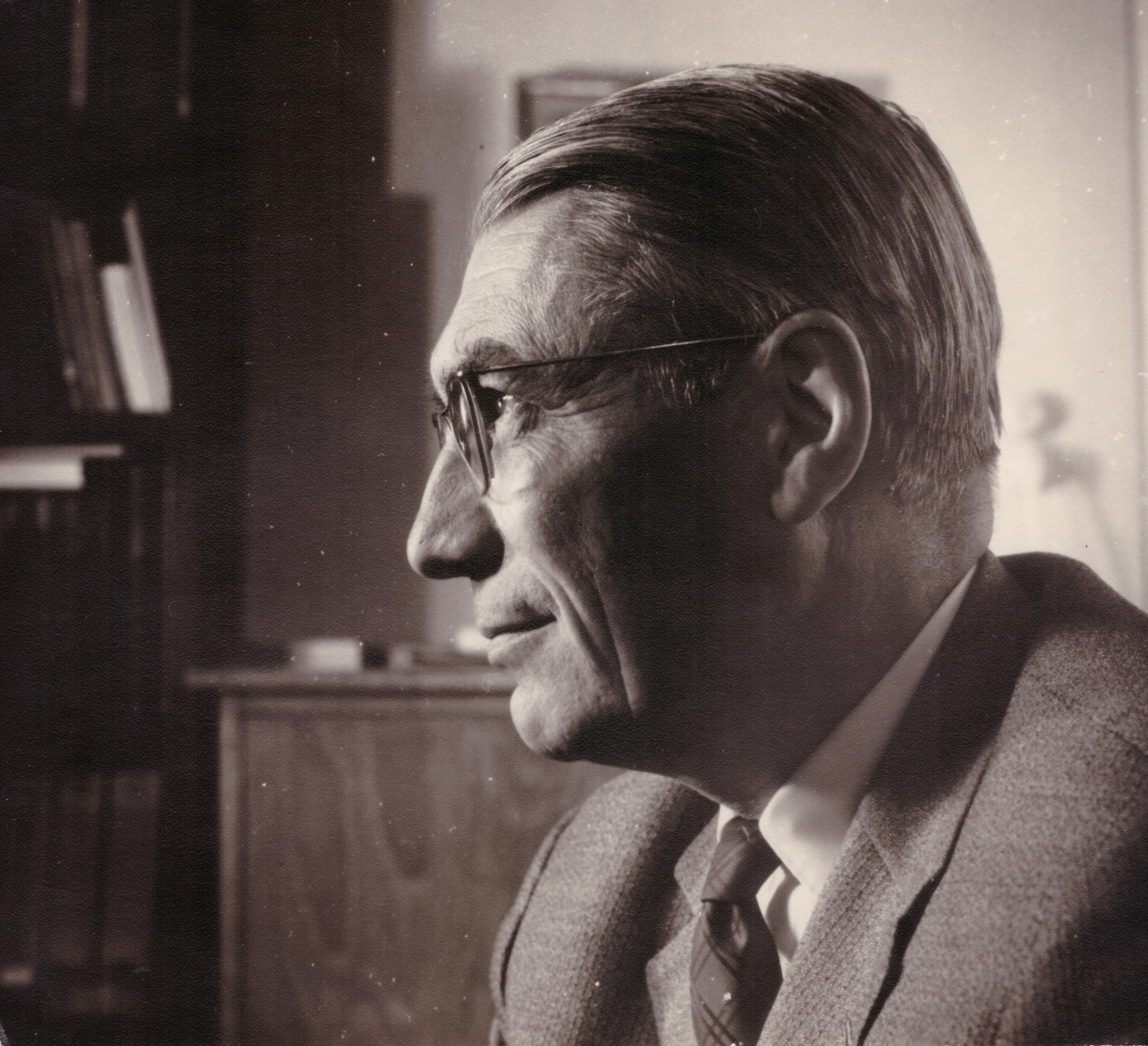
Günter V. Schulz

Günter Victor Schulz (born October 4, 1905, in Łódź; died February 25, 1999, in Mainz) was a German chemist. He made seminal contributions to macromolecular chemistry. His name lives on in the Flory-Schulz distribution and the Schulz-Zimm distribution.

== Literature ==
- August Ludwig Degener, Walter Habel: Wer ist wer? Das deutsche Who's Who, Band 16., Arani, Berlin, 1970 ISBN 3-7605-2007-3, S. 1202.
- Werner Schuder (Hrsg.): Kürschners Deutscher Gelehrten-Kalender. Band 3. 13. Ausgabe. De Gruyter, Berlin/New York 1980, ISBN 3-110-07434-6. S. 3580.
