= Philip J. Wyatt =

US scientist and businessman

- Education: University of Chicago, Christ's College, Cambridge, University of Illinois, Florida State University
- Scientific career
- Fields: Light scattering
- Workplaces: Wyatt Technology
- Website: http://www.wyatt.com/about/team-wyatt/philip-j-wyatt.html

Philip J. Wyatt is an American scientist and businessman who is the founder and Chairman of Wyatt Technology, located in Santa Barbara, California. He is known for contributions to laser light scattering, more specifically the physics of the inverse scattering problem and for commercializing analytical methods and instruments involving laser light scattering, which are widely used in academia, industry, and government.

== Early life and education ==
Wyatt did undergraduate work at the University of Chicago, (B.A., 1952; B.Sc., 1954), and Christ's College, Cambridge. He received his M.S. from the University of Illinois in 1956 and his Ph.D. from Florida State University in 1959, where he first worked on the inverse scattering problem. His Ph.D. work involved the development of a non‑local nuclear model of the scattering of neutrons by nuclei.

He was nominated by the National Academy of Sciences in 1965 as one of sixteen possible candidates for the first Scientist-Astronaut Selection Program in the United States.

== Career ==
As a graduate student, Wyatt worked at Los Alamos National Laboratory. During the 1960s, he worked for the Aeronutronic division of Ford Motor Company, General Research Corporation in Santa Barbara, California, and the defense contractor EG&G.

Wyatt founded his first company, Science Spectrum, Inc., in 1968. The company developed several instruments that could be used to study the inverse scattering problem. They applied light-scattering techniques to the detection of biological weapons and the monitoring of food quality. These early instruments used a traditional single detector to scan a range of scattering angles. Shortly before the closure of the company in 1982, Wyatt developed an instrument for multi-angle light scattering (MALS) in which a glass capillary containing a sample was surrounded by an array of detectors.

Wyatt then founded Wyatt Technology Corporation to develop and sell laser‑based scientific instruments for light scattering and particle size measurement. His instruments are used worldwide by universities, government agencies, the biotech industry and pharmaceutical companies.

Wyatt's instruments are used in a wide variety of fields. Laser particle analysis has been applied to wine and to cleaning products. The U.S. Government has supported work on the identification of bioterrorism threats such as airborne bacteria and metabolic poisons or carcinogens in drinking water. Wyatt's instruments are used for protein analysis by biopharmaceutical companies such as Amgen. They are used for detection of drug and pesticide residues in meat, and monitoring for possible toxicity of AZT and antineoplastic drugs in patients. Nobel prize winner Robert H. Grubbs uses them to study polymers. They are also used to monitor smog and fly ash, and identify effective antibiotics to counter bacterial infections.

“Get into a market that is just on the verge of developing. If you’re too early, the company fails. If you’re a little too late, the competitors will eat you alive because they have much better resources.” Philip J. Wyatt

Wyatt has published over seventy publications, including books. He has at least ninety domestic and foreign patents related to laser light scattering and other technologies.

Wyatt served as the 2012-2013 Chair of the American Physical Society's Forum on Industrial and Applied Physics. Wyatt also served as the 2018-2019 Chair and 2016-2017 Vice Chair of the American Physical Society’s Group on Instrument and Measurement Science.

Wyatt also served on the board of directors of the Santa Barbara City College.

== Awards and honors ==
- 2022, American Physical Society’s George E. Pake Prize, “For pioneering accomplishments and entrepreneurial leadership exemplified by successful global commercialization of laser-based light scattering measurements with multiple applications in biotechnology, analytical chemistry, and nanoparticle characterization.”
- 2009, Inaugural Prize for Industrial Applications of Physics from the American Physical Society “for pioneering developments in the physics of the inverse scattering problem: new application of laser light scattering and the successful sustained commercialization of new related analytical methods and instrumentation.”
- 2003, "Graduate of Distinction", college of arts and sciences, Florida State University.
- Fellow, American Physical Society
- Fellow, Optical Society of America
- Member, American Chemical Society
- Member, American Society for Microbiology
- Member, American Association of Pharmaceutical Scientists
- Fellow, American Association for the Advancement of Science (AAAS)
