= Roelof Houwink =

Dutch polymer scientist

Roelof Houwink (1897–1988) was a Dutch polymer scientist, educated at the University of Delft. He worked at Philips starting in 1925. From 1939 to 1956 he was director-general of the TNOs Rubberinstituut in Delft.

The Mark-Houwink equation is named jointly after Herman F. Mark and him.

== Publications ==
- Elasticity, Plasticity and Structure of Matter, 1937, Cambridge University Press, London
