= Low-angle laser light scattering =

Low-angle laser light scattering or LALLS is an application of light scattering that is particularly useful in conjunction with the technique of Size exclusion chromatography, one of the most powerful and widely used techniques to study the molecular mass distribution of a polymer.

Typically the eluent of the SEC column is allowed to pass through both a refractive index detector (that gives measures for the concentration in the solution as a function time) and through a laser scattering cell. The scattered intensity is measured as a function of time under a small angle with respect to the laser beam. The low-angle light scattering data can be analyzed if one assumes that the low-angle data is the same as the scattering at zero angle. For the relevant equations, see the article on static light scattering. Under these conditions the laser signal together with the concentration data can be translated into a curve that yields both the M_{n} and the M_{w}, the molar mass weighted by number and by weight respectively. The combination of those two data gives information on the linearity of the polymer.

The technique is sometimes complemented or combined with viscometry and polystyrene standards are available for validation of the results.
