= Molar mass distribution =

Function in polymer chemistry

In polymer chemistry, the molar mass distribution (or molecular weight distribution) describes the relationship between the number of moles of each polymer species (N_{i}) and the molar mass (M_{i}) of that species. In linear polymers, the individual polymer chains rarely have exactly the same degree of polymerization and molar mass, and there is always a distribution around an average value. The molar mass distribution of a polymer may be modified by polymer fractionation.

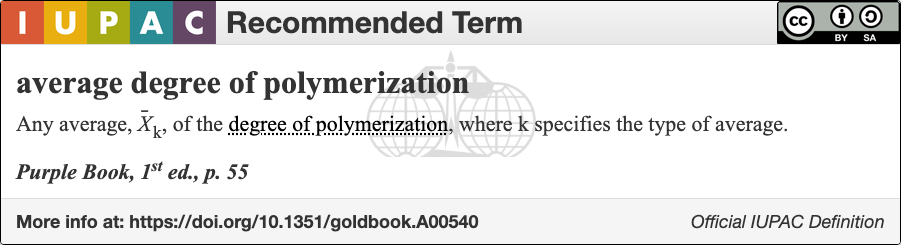
IUPAC definition for average degree of polymerization in polymer chemistry.

== Definitions of molar mass average ==
Different average values can be defined, depending on the statistical method applied. In practice, four averages are used, representing the weighted mean taken with the mole fraction, the weight fraction, and two other functions which can be related to measured quantities:

- Number average molar mass (M_{n}), also loosely referred to as number average molecular weight (NAMW).
- Mass average molar mass (M_{w}), where w stands for weight; also commonly referred to as weight average or weight average molecular weight (WAMW).
- Z-average molar mass (M_{z}), where z stands for centrifugation (from German Zentrifuge).
- Viscosity average molar mass (M_{v}).

$$\begin{align}
M_\mathrm{n} &= \frac{\sum M_i N_i} {\sum N_i}         && M_\mathrm{w} = \frac{\sum M_i^2 N_i} {\sum M_i N_i} \\
M_\mathrm{z} &= \frac{\sum M_i^3 N_i} {\sum M_i^2 N_i} && M_\mathrm{v} = \left[\frac{\sum M_i^{1+a} N_i} {\sum M_i N_i}\right]^\frac{1} {a}
\end{align}$$

Here, a is the exponent in the Mark–Houwink equation that relates the intrinsic viscosity to molar mass.

== Measurement ==
These different definitions have true physical meaning because different techniques in physical polymer chemistry often measure just one of them. For instance, osmometry measures number average molar mass and small-angle laser light scattering measures mass average molar mass. M_{v} is obtained from viscosimetry and M_{z} by sedimentation in an analytical ultra-centrifuge. The quantity a in the expression for the viscosity average molar mass varies from 0.5 to 0.8 and depends on the interaction between solvent and polymer in a dilute solution. In a typical distribution curve, the average values are related to each other as follows:
$$M_n < M_v < M_w < M_z.$$
The dispersity (also known as the polydispersity index) of a sample is defined as M_{w} divided by M_{n} and gives an indication just how narrow a distribution is.

The most common technique for measuring molecular mass used in modern times is a variant of high-pressure liquid chromatography (HPLC) known by the interchangeable terms of size exclusion chromatography (SEC) and gel permeation chromatography (GPC). These techniques involve forcing a polymer solution through a matrix of cross-linked polymer particles at a pressure of up to several hundred bar. The limited accessibility of stationary phase pore volume for the polymer molecules results in shorter elution times for high-molecular-mass species. The use of low dispersity standards allows the user to correlate retention time with molecular mass, although the actual correlation is with the Hydrodynamic volume. If the relationship between molar mass and the hydrodynamic volume changes (i.e., the polymer is not exactly the same shape as the standard) then the calibration for mass is in error.

The most common detectors used for size exclusion chromatography include online methods similar to the bench methods used above. By far the most common is the differential refractive index detector that measures the change in refractive index of the solvent. This detector is concentration-sensitive and very molecular-mass-insensitive, so it is ideal for a single-detector GPC system, as it allows the generation of mass v's molecular mass curves. Less common but more accurate and reliable is a molecular-mass-sensitive detector using multi-angle laser-light scattering - see static light scattering. These detectors directly measure the molecular mass of the polymer and are most often used in conjunction with differential refractive index detectors. A further alternative is either low-angle light scattering, which uses a single low angle to determine the molar mass, or Right-angle-light laser scattering in combination with a viscometer, although this latter technique does not give an absolute measure of molar mass but one relative to the structural model used.

The molar mass distribution of a polymer sample depends on factors such as chemical kinetics and work-up procedure. Ideal step-growth polymerization gives a polymer with dispersity of 2. Ideal living polymerization results in a dispersity of 1. By dissolving a polymer an insoluble high molar mass fraction may be filtered off resulting in a large reduction in M_{w} and a small reduction in M_{n}, thus reducing dispersity.

=== Number average molar mass ===
The number average molar mass is a way of determining the molecular mass of a polymer. Polymer molecules, even ones of the same type, come in different sizes (chain lengths, for linear polymers), so the average molecular mass will depend on the method of averaging. The number average molecular mass is the ordinary arithmetic mean or average of the molecular masses of the individual macromolecules. It is determined by measuring the molecular mass of n polymer molecules, summing the masses, and dividing by n.
$$\bar{M}_n = \frac{\sum_i N_i M_i}{\sum_i N_i}$$
The number average molecular mass of a polymer can be determined by gel permeation chromatography, viscometry via the (Mark–Houwink equation), colligative methods such as vapor pressure osmometry, end-group determination or proton NMR.

High number-average molecular mass polymers may be obtained only with a high fractional monomer conversion in the case of step-growth polymerization, as per the Carothers' equation.

=== Mass average molar mass ===
The mass average molar mass (often loosely termed weight average molar mass) is another way of describing the molar mass of a polymer. Some properties are dependent on molecular size, so a larger molecule will have a larger contribution than a smaller molecule. The mass average molar mass is calculated by
$$\bar{M}_w = \frac{\sum_i N_i M_i^2}{\sum_i N_i M_i}$$
where N_{i} is the number of molecules of molecular mass M_{i}.

The mass average molecular mass can be determined by static light scattering, small angle neutron scattering, X-ray scattering, and sedimentation velocity.

The ratio of the mass average to the number average is called the dispersity or the polydispersity index.

The mass-average molecular mass, M_{w}, is also related to the fractional monomer conversion, p, in step-growth polymerization (for the simplest case of linear polymers formed from two monomers in equimolar quantities) as per Carothers' equation:
$$\bar{X}_w = \frac{1+p}{1-p} \quad \bar{M}_w = \frac{M_o\left(1+p\right)}{1-p},$$
where M_{o} is the molecular mass of the repeating unit.

=== Z-average molar mass ===
The z-average molar mass is the third moment or third power average molar mass, which is calculated by

$$\bar{M}_z = \frac{\sum M_i^3 N_i} {\sum M_i^2 N_i}$$

The z-average molar mass can be determined with ultracentrifugation. The melt elasticity of a polymer is dependent on M_{z}.

== See also ==
- Distribution function
- Flory–Schulz distribution
- Schulz-Zimm distribution
- Mass distribution
- Sedimentation
