= Poly(methacrylic acid) =

Names
- IUPAC name poly(1-methylprop-1-enoic acid)
- Other names poly(methacrylic acid)

Identifiers
| CAS Number | 25087-26-7 |
| ChemSpider | none |
| ECHA InfoCard | 100.207.383 |
| CompTox Dashboard (EPA) | DTXSID3025542 DTXSID50873908, DTXSID3025542 |

Properties
| Chemical formula | (C_{4}H_{6}O_{2})_{n} |
| Molar mass | Variable |
| Solubility in water | Soluble |
- Except where otherwise noted, data are given for materials in their standard state (at 25 °C [77 °F], 100 kPa). (what is ?) Infobox references

Poly(methacrylic acid) (PMAA) is a polymer made from methacrylic acid (preferred IUPAC name, 2-methylprop-2-enoic acid), which is a carboxylic acid. It is often available as its sodium salt, poly(methacrylic acid) sodium salt. The monomer is a viscous liquid with a pungent odour. The first polymeric form of methacrylic acid was described in 1880 by Engelhorn and Fittig. The use of high purity monomers is required for proper polymerization conditions and therefore it is necessary to remove any inhibitors by extraction (phenolic inhibitors) or via distillation. To prevent inhibition by dissolved oxygen, monomers should be carefully degassed prior to the start of the polymerization.

== Polymerization ==
PMAA has a pKa of ~4.8, meaning that at neutral pH the MAA groups in the network are almost entirely deprotonated making it an anionic polymer. PMAA can act as a polyelectrolyte and has the ability to absorb and retain water. These properties are strongly affected by the pH and therefore many hydrogels are composed of PMAA copolymers. These hydrogel capsules can act as carrier vessels for confined drugs and act as microreactor reservoirs. For certain applications the sodium salt form of PMAA is used, in order to minimize side effects occurring from the anionic charge of the polymer or in applications where solubility in different solvents is required.

The conventional synthesis method of PMAA is free radical polymerization. In aqueous solution, substantial differences have been described in the polymerization rate of non-ionized and fully ionized MAA (pH effect). For the non-ionized scenario, a kinetic model has been well described. Recent progress has been made for (partially) ionized MAA by introducing a new rate law for propagation where electrostatic and non-electrostatic effects are explicitly considered. In addition, the rate constant of propagation (kp) during free radical polymerization of methacrylic acid is dependent on the monomer concentration. Using pulsed layer polymerization size-exclusion chromatography techniques, it was determined that there is a minor decrease in kp for partially ionized MAA as monomer concentration increases while kp increases for fully ionized MAA as monomer concentration increases. The latter is in accordance with transition state theory for propagation.

Controlled polymerization techniques, such as RAFT and NMP can be used for the direct polymerization of MAA. In contrast, polymerization of acidic monomers, such as MAA, has traditionally posed a challenge with, for example, anionic polymerization, group transfer polymerization (GTP, see living polymerization) and ATRP. The latter is not currently well understood but reasons hypothesized include ligand protonation at low pH, competitive coordination of carboxylate moieties to the copper and displacement of halide anions from the Cu(II) deactivator complex. Protecting group chemistry is commonly used for the polymerization of acidic monomers (using alkyl esters), followed by deprotection and purification, but other methods have also been explored. PMAA cyclization proved to be the main cause of termination, and this was reduced by changing the leaving group and the nucleophile, lowering the pH to reduce concentration and carboxylate anions, and accelerating the rate of polymerization. This work overcame one of the main limitations in ATRP and showed that water can be used as solvent for the polymerization of polar monomers using ATRP.

== See also ==
- Poly(methyl methacrylate) (PMMA)
