= Flory–Schulz distribution =

Probability distribution in chemistry

- Probability mass function
- Parameters: 0 < a < 1 (real)
- Support: k ∈ { 1, 2, 3, ... }
- PMF: $a^2 k (1-a)^{k-1}$
- CDF: $1-(1-a)^k (1+ a k)$
- Mean: $\frac{2}{a}-1$
- Median: $\frac{W\left(\frac{(1-a)^{\frac{1}{a}} \log (1-a)}{2 a}\right)}{\log (1-a)}-\frac{1}{a}$
- Mode: $-\frac{1}{\log (1-a)}$
- Variance: $\frac{2-2 a}{a^2}$
- Skewness: $\frac{2-a}{\sqrt{2-2 a}}$
- Excess kurtosis: $\frac{(a-6) a+6}{2-2 a}$
- MGF: $\frac{a^2 e^t}{\left((a-1) e^t+1\right)^2}$
- CF: $\frac{a^2 e^{i t}}{\left(1+(a-1) e^{i t}\right)^2}$
- PGF: $\frac{a^2 z}{((a-1) z+1)^2}$

The Flory–Schulz distribution is a discrete probability distribution named after Paul Flory and Günter Victor Schulz that describes the relative ratios of polymers of different length that occur in an ideal step-growth polymerization process. The probability mass function (pmf) for the mass fraction of chains of length $k$ is:
$$w_a(k) = a^2 k (1-a)^{k-1}\text{.}$$

In this equation, k is the number of monomers in the chain, and 0<a<1 is an empirically determined constant related to the fraction of unreacted monomer remaining.

The form of this distribution implies is that shorter polymers are favored over longer ones — the chain length is geometrically distributed. Apart from polymerization processes, this distribution is also relevant to the Fischer–Tropsch process that is conceptually related, where it is known as Anderson-Schulz-Flory (ASF) distribution, in that lighter hydrocarbons are converted to heavier hydrocarbons that are desirable as a liquid fuel.

The pmf of this distribution is a solution of the following equation:
$$\left\{\begin{array}{l}
(a-1) (k+1) w_a(k)+k w_a(k+1)=0\text{,} \\[10pt]
w_a(0)=0\text{,} w_a(1)=a^2\text{.}
\end{array}\right\}$$
As a probability distribution, if X and Y are two independent and geometrically distributed random variables with parameter $a$ taking values in $\{0, 1, \cdots\}$, then
$$w_a(k) = \mathbb{P}\left(X + Y + 1 = k\right)$$
This in turn means that the Flory-Schulz distribution is a shifted version of the negative binomial distribution, with parameters $r = 2$ and $p = a$.
