= Hydrodynamic radius =

Property of colloids and macromolecukes

The hydrodynamic radius of a macromolecule or colloid particle is $R_{\rm hyd}$. The macromolecule or colloid particle is a collection of $N$ subparticles. This is done most commonly for polymers; the subparticles would then be the units of the polymer. For polymers in solution, $R_{\rm hyd}$ is defined by

$$\frac{1}{R_{\rm hyd}} \ \stackrel{\mathrm{def}}{=}\  \frac{1}{2N^{2}} \left\langle \sum_{i \neq j} \frac{1}{r_{ij}} \right\rangle$$

where $r_{ij}$ is the distance between subparticles $i$ and $j$, and where the angular brackets $\langle \ldots \rangle$ represent an ensemble average. The theoretical hydrodynamic radius $R_{\rm hyd}$ was originally an estimate by John Gamble Kirkwood of the Stokes radius of a polymer, and some sources still use hydrodynamic radius as a synonym for the Stokes radius.

Note that in biophysics, hydrodynamic radius refers to the Stokes radius, or commonly to the apparent Stokes radius obtained from size exclusion chromatography.

The theoretical hydrodynamic radius $R_{\rm hyd}$ arises in the study of the dynamic properties of polymers moving in a solvent. It is often similar in magnitude to the radius of gyration.

== Applications to aerosols ==
The mobility of non-spherical aerosol particles can be described by the hydrodynamic radius. In the continuum limit, where the mean free path of the particle is negligible compared to a characteristic length scale of the particle, the hydrodynamic radius is defined as the radius that gives the same magnitude of the frictional force, $\boldsymbol{F}_d$ as that of a sphere with that radius, i.e.

$$\boldsymbol{F}_d = 6\pi\mu R_{hyd}\boldsymbol{v}$$

where $\mu$ is the viscosity of the surrounding fluid, and $\boldsymbol{v}$ is the velocity of the particle. This is analogous to the Stokes' radius, however this is untrue as the mean free path becomes comparable to the characteristic length scale of the particulate - a correction factor is introduced such that the friction is correct over the entire Knudsen regime. As is often the case, the Cunningham correction factor $C$ is used, where:

$$\boldsymbol{F}_d = \frac{6\pi\mu R_{hyd}\boldsymbol{v}}{C}, \quad \text{where:} \quad
C = 1+\text{Kn}(\alpha + \beta \text{e}^{\frac{\gamma}{\text{Kn}}})$$,

where $\alpha, \beta, \text{ and } \gamma$ were found by Millikan to be: 1.234, 0.414, and 0.876 respectively.
