= Size-exclusion chromatography =

Chemical-analysis technique

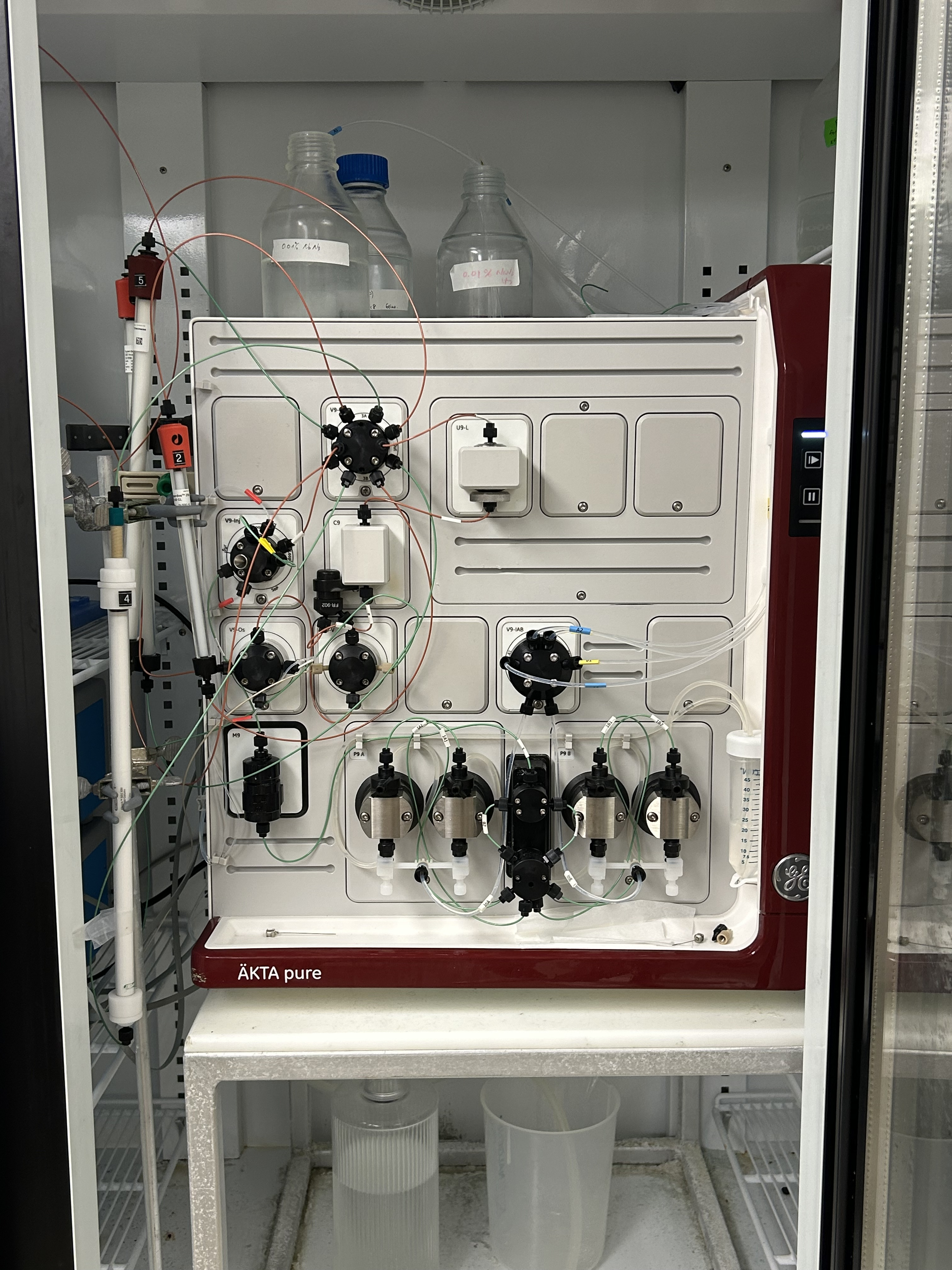
- Equipment for running size-exclusion chromatography. The buffer is pumped through the column (left).
- Acronym: SEC
- Classification: Chromatography
- Analytes: macromolecules synthetic polymers biomolecules
- Manufacturers: Cytiva, Bio-Rad, Bio-Works, emp Biotech, Knauer, Phenomenex.

Other techniques
- Related: High-performance liquid chromatography Aqueous normal-phase chromatography Ion exchange chromatography Micellar liquid chromatography

Size-exclusion chromatography, also known as molecular sieve chromatography, is a chromatographic method in which molecules in solution are separated by their shape, and in some cases size. It is usually applied to large molecules or macromolecular complexes such as proteins and industrial polymers. Typically, when an aqueous solution is used to transport the sample through the column, the technique is known as gel filtration chromatography, versus the name gel permeation chromatography, which is used when an organic solvent is used as a mobile phase. The chromatography column is packed with fine, porous beads which are commonly composed of dextran, agarose, or polyacrylamide polymers. The pore sizes of these beads are used to estimate the dimensions of macromolecules. SEC is a widely used polymer characterization method because of its ability to provide good molar mass distribution (Mw) results for polymers.

Size-exclusion chromatography (SEC) is fundamentally different from all other chromatographic techniques in that separation is based on a simple procedure of classifying molecule sizes rather than any type of interaction.

== Applications ==
The main application of size-exclusion chromatography is the fractionation of proteins and other water-soluble polymers, while gel permeation chromatography is used to analyze the molecular weight distribution of organic-soluble polymers. Either technique should not be confused with gel electrophoresis, where an electric field is used to "pull" molecules through the gel depending on their electrical charges. The amount of time a solute remains within a pore is dependent on the size of the pore. Larger solutes will have access to a smaller volume and vice versa. Therefore, a smaller solute will remain within the pore for a longer period of time compared to a larger solute.

Even though size exclusion chromatography is widely utilized to study natural organic material, there are limitations. One of these limitations include that there is no standard molecular weight marker; thus, there is nothing to compare the results back to. If precise molecular weight is required, other methods should be used.

== Advantages ==
The advantages of this method include good separation of large molecules from the small molecules with a minimal volume of eluate, and that various solutions can be applied without interfering with the filtration process, all while preserving the biological activity of the particles to separate. The technique is generally combined with others that further separate molecules by other characteristics, such as acidity, basicity, charge, and affinity for certain compounds. With size exclusion chromatography, there are short and well-defined separation times and narrow bands, which lead to good sensitivity. There is also no sample loss because solutes do not interact with the stationary phase.

The other advantage to this experimental method is that in certain cases, it is feasible to determine the approximate molecular weight of a compound. The shape and size of the compound (eluent) determine how the compound interacts with the gel (stationary phase). To determine approximate molecular weight, the elution volumes of compounds with their corresponding molecular weights are obtained and then a plot of "K_{av}" vs "log(Mw)" is made, where $K_{av} = (V_e-V_o)/(V_t-V_o)$ and Mw is the molecular mass. This plot acts as a calibration curve, which is used to approximate the desired compound's molecular weight. The V_{e} component represents the volume at which the intermediate molecules elute such as molecules that have partial access to the beads of the column. In addition, V_{t} is the sum of the total volume between the beads and the volume within the beads. The V_{o} component represents the volume at which the larger molecules elute, which elute in the beginning. Disadvantages are, for example, that only a limited number of bands can be accommodated because the time scale of the chromatogram is short, and, in general, there must be a 10% difference in molecular mass to have a good resolution.

== Discovery ==
The technique was invented in 1955 by Grant Henry Lathe and Colin R Ruthven, working at Queen Charlotte's Hospital, London. They later received the John Scott Award for this invention. While Lathe and Ruthven used starch gels as the matrix, Jerker Porath and Per Flodin later introduced dextran gels; other gels with size fractionation properties include agarose and polyacrylamide. A short review of these developments has appeared.

There were also attempts to fractionate synthetic high polymers; however, it was not until 1964, when J. C. Moore of the Dow Chemical Company published his work on the preparation of gel permeation chromatography (GPC) columns based on cross-linked polystyrene with controlled pore size, that a rapid increase of research activity in this field began. It was recognized almost immediately that with proper calibration, GPC was capable to provide molar mass and molar mass distribution information for synthetic polymers. Because the latter information was difficult to obtain by other methods, GPC came rapidly into extensive use.

== Theory and method ==
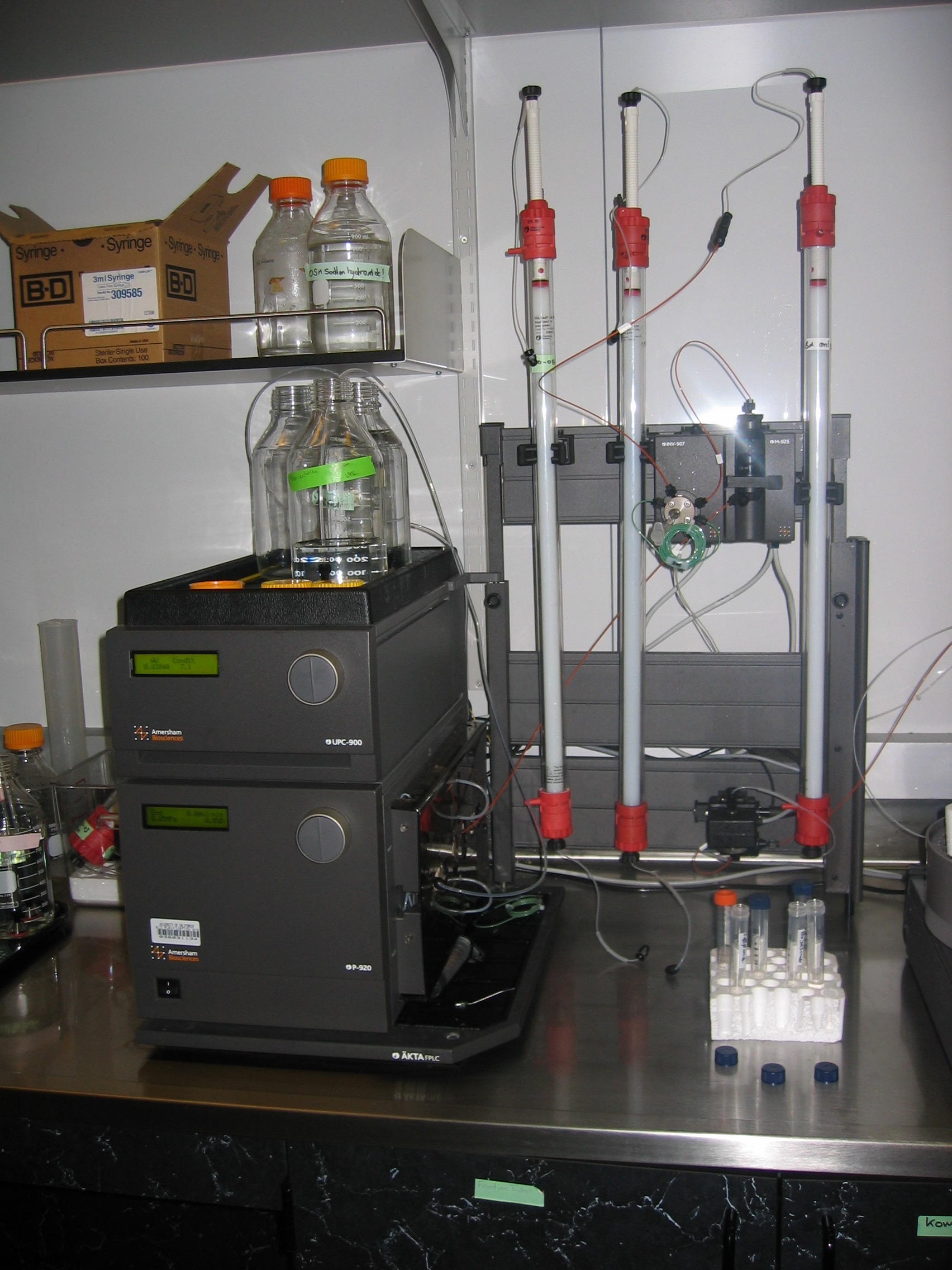
Agarose-based SEC columns used for protein purification on an AKTA FPLC machine

SEC is used primarily for the analysis of large molecules such as proteins or polymers. SEC works by trapping smaller molecules in the pores of the adsorbent ("stationary phase"). This process is usually performed within a column, which typically consists of a hollow tube tightly packed with micron-scale polymer beads containing pores of different sizes. These pores may be depressions on the surface or channels through the bead. As the solution travels down the column some particles enter into the pores. Larger particles cannot enter into as many pores. The larger the particles, the faster the elution. The larger molecules simply pass by the pores because those molecules are too large to enter the pores. Larger molecules therefore flow through the column more quickly than smaller molecules, that is, the smaller the molecule, the longer the retention time.

One requirement for SEC is that the analyte does not interact with the surface of the stationary phases, with differences in elution time between analytes ideally being based solely on the solute volume the analytes can enter, rather than chemical or electrostatic interactions with the stationary phases. Thus, a small molecule that can penetrate every region of the stationary phase pore system can enter a total volume equal to the sum of the entire pore volume and the interparticle volume. This small molecule elutes late (after the molecule has penetrated all of the pore- and interparticle volume—approximately 80% of the column volume). At the other extreme, a very large molecule that cannot penetrate any the smaller pores can enter only the interparticle volume (~35% of the column volume) and elutes earlier when this volume of mobile phase has passed through the column. The underlying principle of SEC is that particles of different sizes elute (filter) through a stationary phase at different rates. This results in the separation of a solution of particles based on size. Provided that all the particles are loaded simultaneously or near-simultaneously, particles of the same size should elute together.

However, as there are various measures of the size of a macromolecule (for instance, the radius of gyration and the hydrodynamic radius), a fundamental problem in the theory of SEC has been the choice of a proper molecular size parameter by which molecules of different kinds are separated. Experimentally, Benoit and co-workers found an excellent correlation between elution volume and a dynamically based molecular size, the hydrodynamic volume, for several different chain architecture and chemical compositions. The observed correlation based on the hydrodynamic volume became accepted as the basis of universal SEC calibration.

Still, the use of the hydrodynamic volume, a size based on dynamical properties, in the interpretation of SEC data is not fully understood. This is because SEC is typically run under low flow rate conditions where hydrodynamic factor should have little effect on the separation. In fact, both theory and computer simulations assume a thermodynamic separation principle: the separation process is determined by the equilibrium distribution (partitioning) of solute macromolecules between two phases: a dilute bulk solution phase located at the interstitial space and confined solution phases within the pores of column packing material. Based on this theory, it has been shown that the relevant size parameter to the partitioning of polymers in pores is the mean span dimension (mean maximal projection onto a line). Although this issue has not been fully resolved, it is likely that the mean span dimension and the hydrodynamic volume are strongly correlated.

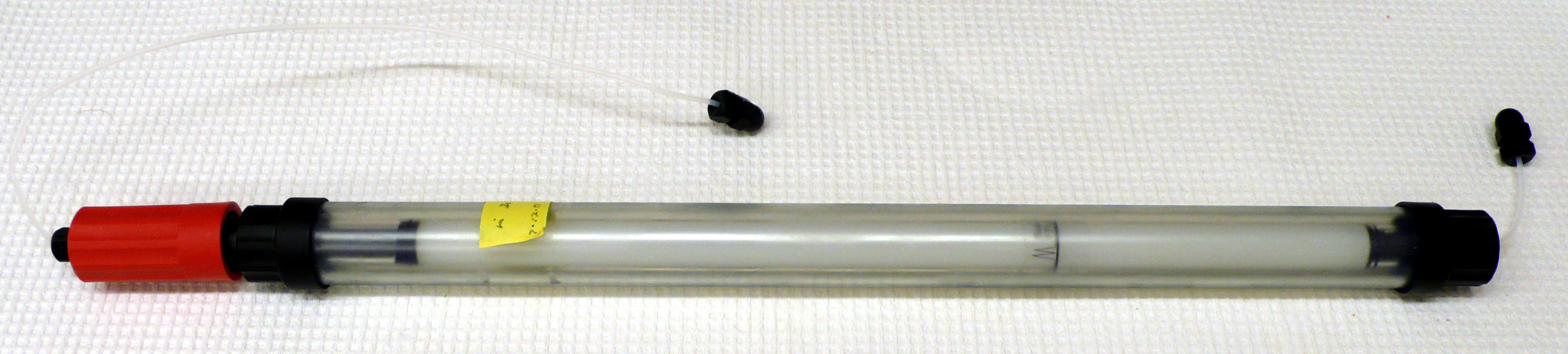
A size exclusion column

Each size exclusion column has a range of molecular weights that can be separated. The exclusion limit defines the molecular weight at the upper end of the column 'working' range and is where molecules are too large to get trapped in the stationary phase. The lower end of the range is defined by the permeation limit, which defines the molecular weight of a molecule that is small enough to penetrate all pores of the stationary phase. All molecules below this molecular mass are so small that they elute as a single band.

The filtered solution that is collected at the end is known as the eluate. The void volume includes any particles too large to enter the medium, and the solvent volume is known as the column volume.

Following are the materials which are commonly used for porous gel beads in size exclusion chromatography

Sr. No	Material And Trade name	Fractionation range (kDa)
1	Sephadex G-10	0–0.7
2	Sephadex G-25	1–5
3	Sephadex G-50	1.5–30
4	Sephadex G-75	3–70
5	Sephadex G-100	4–150
6	Sephadex G-150	5–300
7	Sephadex G-200	5–8000
8	Bio-gel P-2	0.1–1.8
9	Bio-gel P-6	1–6
10	Bio-gel P-60	3–60
11	Bio-gel P-150	1.5–150
12	Bio-gel P-300	16–400
13	Sepharose 2B	2000–25000
14	Sepharose 4B	300–3000
15	Sepharose 6B	10–20000

== Factors affecting filtration ==
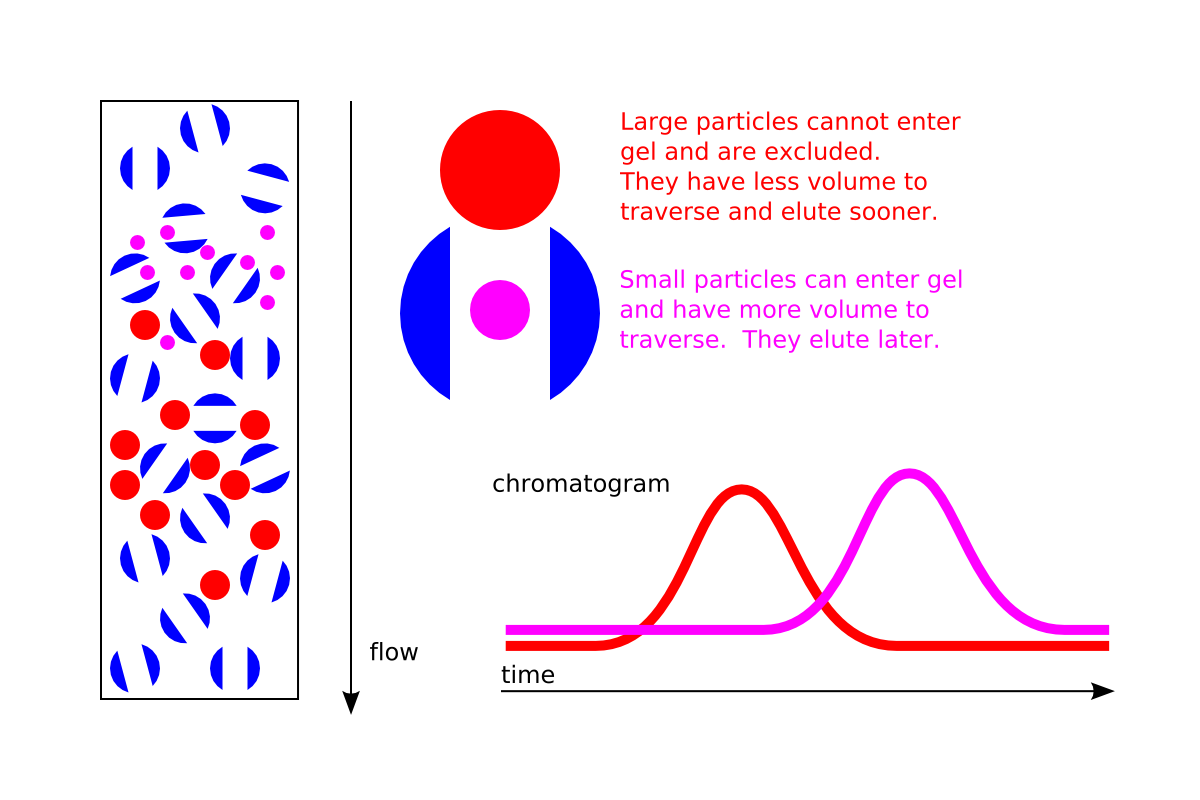
A cartoon illustrating the theory behind size exclusion chromatography

In real-life situations, particles in solution do not have a fixed size, resulting in the probability that a particle that would otherwise be hampered by a pore passing right by it. Also, the stationary-phase particles are not ideally defined; both particles and pores may vary in size. Elution curves, therefore, resemble Gaussian distributions. The stationary phase may also interact in undesirable ways with a particle and influence retention times, though great care is taken by column manufacturers to use stationary phases that are inert and minimize this issue.

Like other forms of chromatography, increasing the column length enhances resolution, and increasing the column diameter increases column capacity. Proper column packing is important for maximum resolution: An over-packed column can collapse the pores in the beads, resulting in a loss of resolution. An under-packed column can reduce the relative surface area of the stationary phase accessible to smaller species, resulting in those species spending less time trapped in pores. Unlike affinity chromatography techniques, a solvent head at the top of the column can drastically diminish resolution as the sample diffuses prior to loading, broadening the downstream elution.

== Analysis ==
In simple manual columns, the eluent is collected in constant volumes, known as fractions. The more similar the particles are in size the more likely they are in the same fraction and not detected separately. More advanced columns overcome this problem by constantly monitoring the eluent.

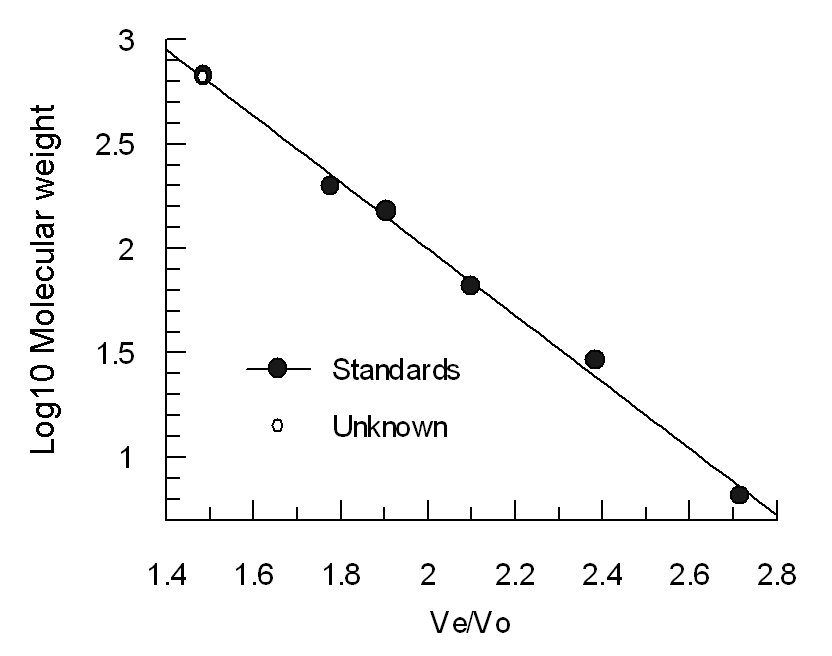
Standardization (calibration) of a size exclusion column

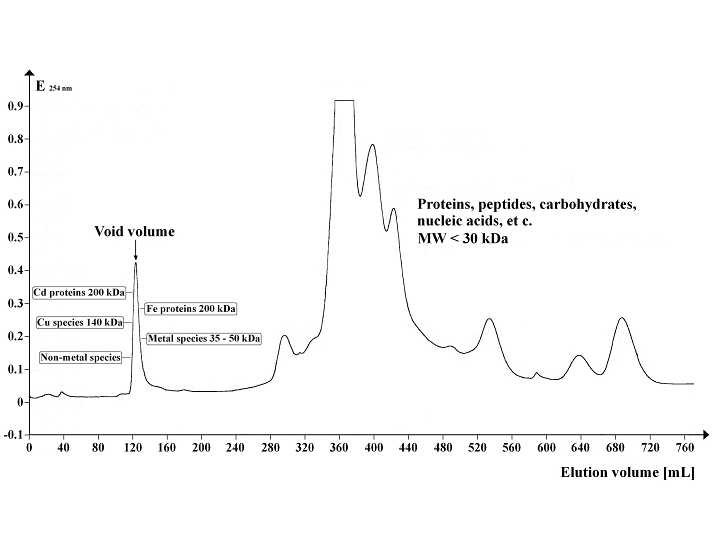
Size exclusion chromatogram after bioanalytical continuous-elution gel chromatography of a cytosolic model plant sample

The collected fractions are often examined by spectroscopic techniques to determine the concentration of the particles eluted. Common spectroscopy detection techniques are refractive index (RI) and ultraviolet (UV). When eluting spectroscopically similar species (such as during biological purification), other techniques may be necessary to identify the contents of each fraction. It is also possible to analyze the eluent flow continuously with RI, LALLS, Multi-Angle Laser Light Scattering MALS, UV, and/or viscosity measurements.

The elution volume (Ve) decreases roughly linear with the logarithm of the molecular hydrodynamic volume. Columns are often calibrated using 4–5 standard samples (e.g., folded proteins of known molecular weight), and a sample containing a very large molecule such as thyroglobulin to determine the void volume. (Blue dextran is not recommended for Vo determination because it is heterogeneous and may give variable results) The elution volumes of the standards are divided by the elution volume of the thyroglobulin (Ve/Vo) and plotted against the log of the standards' molecular weights.

== Applications ==
=== Biochemical applications ===
In general, SEC is considered a low-resolution chromatography as it does not discern similar species very well, and is therefore often reserved for the final step of a purification. The technique can determine the quaternary structure of purified proteins that have slow exchange times, since it can be carried out under native solution conditions, preserving macromolecular interactions. SEC can also assay protein tertiary structure, as it measures the hydrodynamic volume (not molecular weight), allowing folded and unfolded versions of the same protein to be distinguished. For example, the apparent hydrodynamic radius of a typical protein domain might be 14 Å and 36 Å for the folded and unfolded forms, respectively. SEC allows the separation of these two forms, as the folded form elutes much later due to its smaller size.

=== Extracellular vesicles ===
SEC is also used to isolate extracellular vesicles from biological fluids. Larger vesicles elute before smaller soluble proteins, allowing relatively gentle recovery without binding the vesicles to the stationary phase. However, particles of similar size may co-elute, so SEC is often combined with ultrafiltration, affinity capture, or other separation methods to improve purity.

=== Polymer synthesis ===
SEC can be used as a measure of both the size and the polydispersity of a synthesized polymer, that is, the ability to find the distribution of the sizes of polymer molecules. If standards of a known size are run previously, then a calibration curve can be created to determine the sizes of polymer molecules of interest in the solvent chosen for analysis (often THF). In alternative fashion, techniques such as light scattering and/or viscometry can be used online with SEC to yield absolute molecular weights that do not rely on calibration with standards of known molecular weight. Due to the difference in size of two polymers with identical molecular weights, the absolute determination methods are, in general, more desirable. A typical SEC system can quickly (in about half an hour) give polymer chemists information on the size and polydispersity of the sample. The preparative SEC can be used for polymer fractionation on an analytical scale.

== Drawbacks ==
In SEC, mass is not measured so much as the hydrodynamic volume. The molecular weight can be approximated from SEC data by the relationship between molecular weight and hydrodynamic volume for polystyrene standards. Another drawback is the possibility of interaction between the stationary phase and the analyte. Any interaction leads to a later elution time and thus mimics a smaller analyte size.

Band broadening occurs by turbulence, thermal diffusion, and friction. Bands also overlap with each other. As a result, the eluent usually gets considerably diluted. A few precautions can be taken to prevent the likelihood of the bands broadening. For instance, one can apply the sample in a narrow, highly concentrated band on the top of the column. The more concentrated the eluent is, the more efficient the procedure would be.

== Absolute size-exclusion chromatography ==
Absolute size-exclusion chromatography (ASEC) is a technique that couples a light scattering instrument, most commonly multi-angle light scattering (MALS) or another form of static light scattering (SLS), but possibly a dynamic light scattering (DLS) instrument, to a size-exclusion chromatography system for absolute molar mass and/or size measurements of proteins and macromolecules as they elute from the chromatography system.

The definition of "absolute" in this case is that calibration of retention time on the column with a set of reference standards is not required to obtain molar mass or the hydrodynamic size, often referred to as hydrodynamic diameter (D_{H} in units of nm). Non-ideal column interactions, such as electrostatic or hydrophobic surface interactions that modulate retention time relative to standards, do not impact the final result. Likewise, differences between conformation of the analyte and the standard have no effect on an absolute measurement; for example, with MALS analysis, the molar mass of inherently disordered proteins are characterized accurately even though they elute at much earlier times than globular proteins with the same molar mass, and the same is true of branched polymers which elute late compared to linear reference standards with the same molar mass. Another benefit of ASEC is that the molar mass and/or size is determined at each point in an eluting peak, and therefore indicates homogeneity or polydispersity within the peak. For example, SEC-MALS analysis of a monodisperse protein will show that the entire peak consists of molecules with the same molar mass, something that is not possible with standard SEC analysis.

Determination of molar mass with SLS requires combining the light scattering measurements with concentration measurements. Therefore SEC-MALS typically includes the light scattering detector and either a differential refractometer or UV/Vis absorbance detector. In addition, MALS determines the rms radius R_{g} of molecules above a certain size limit, typically 10 nm. SEC-MALS can therefore analyze the conformation of polymers via the relationship of molar mass to R_{g}. For smaller molecules, either DLS or, more commonly, a differential viscometer is added to determine hydrodynamic radius and evaluate molecular conformation in the same manner.

In SEC-DLS, the sizes of the macromolecules are measured as they elute into the flow cell of the DLS instrument from the size exclusion column set. The hydrodynamic size of the molecules or particles are measured and not their molecular weights. For proteins a Mark-Houwink type of calculation can be used to estimate the molecular weight from the hydrodynamic size.

A major advantage of DLS coupled with SEC is the ability to obtain enhanced DLS resolution. Batch DLS is quick and simple and provides a direct measure of the average size, but the baseline resolution of DLS is a ratio of 3:1 in diameter. Using SEC, the proteins and protein oligomers are separated, allowing oligomeric resolution. Aggregation studies can also be done using ASEC. Though the aggregate concentration may not be calculated with light scattering (an online concentration detector such as that used in SEC-MALS for molar mass measurement also determines aggregate concentration), the size of the aggregate can be measured, only limited by the maximum size eluting from the SEC columns.

Limitations of ASEC with DLS detection include flow-rate, concentration, and precision. Because a correlation function requires anywhere from 3–7 seconds to properly build, a limited number of data points can be collected across the peak. ASEC with SLS detection is not limited by flow rate and measurement time is essentially instantaneous, and the range of concentration is several orders of magnitude larger than for DLS. However, molar mass analysis with SEC-MALS does require accurate concentration measurements. MALS and DLS detectors are often combined in a single instrument for more comprehensive absolute analysis following separation by SEC.

== See also ==
- PEGylation
- Gel permeation chromatography
- Protein purification
