= Differential refractometer =

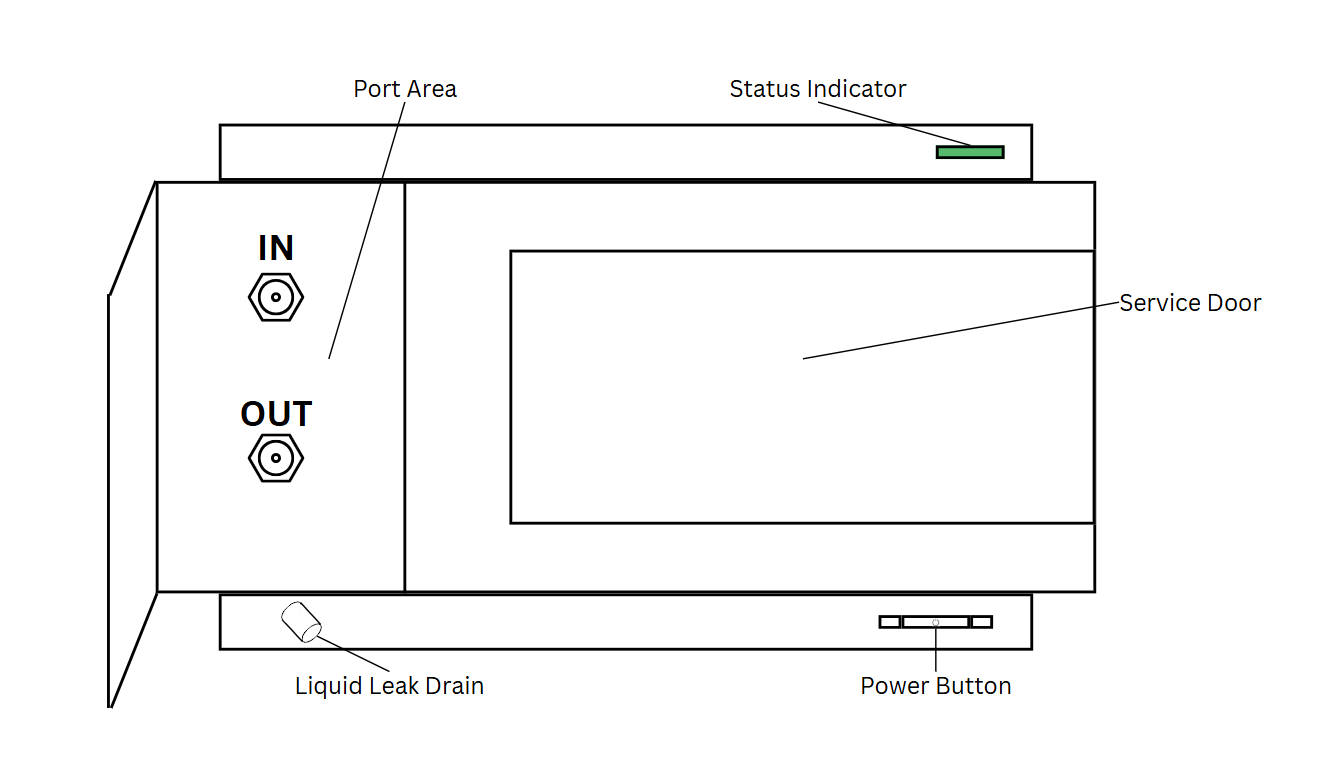
A diagram of the general front-view of a differential refractometer.

A differential refractometer (DRI), or refractive index detector (RI or RID) is a detector that measures the refractive index of an analyte relative to the solvent. DRIs are often used as detectors for high-performance liquid chromatography and size exclusion chromatography. They are considered to be universal detectors because they can detect anything with a refractive index different from the solvent, but they have low sensitivity.

== Refractive index increment ==
The refractive index increment,$\frac{dn}{dC}$, often expressed as mL/g, is the change in a solutions' refractive index vs concentration. A differential refractometer facilitates determining this term. Typical light sources include Helium–neon laser, Argon-ion laser, and Sodium-vapor lamp. There are two compartments or flow cells, one for the sample and the other for the reference solution.

The optical wedge or prism sits after the cells and separates the light coming from the flow cells. The difference in refractive index causes the light paths to reflect at different angles. This difference is magnified by the optical wedge/prism.

A detector that can measure a range of wavelengths, usually a Photodiode array, measures the position of the two light paths. The detector quantifies the angle of refraction, which is proportional to the refractive index.

== General Operation ==
=== Common Differential Refractometer Brands ===
There exist various brands of differential refractometers. Popular models include:

- Waters 2414 Refractive Index Detector
- Agilent 1290 Infinity II Refractive Index Detector
- Thermo Scientific RefractoMax521 Refractive Index Detector

=== Instrument Calibration and Quality Control ===
All refractive index detectors require calibration upon first setting up the instrument as well as periodic quality control. Most manufacturer's recommend calibration with pure water and a sucrose calibration solution of a known refractive index. Once the instrument is in calibration mode, the pure water acts as a zero baseline reading, while the sucrose solution compares its known RI to the output, and the machine is adjusted accordingly.

After the pump has not been used for a while, it is necessary to purge the tubes of any contaminant air that has diffused into the channels. This is typically accomplished with isopropyl alcohol.

== Data Utility ==
Differential refractometers are often used for the analysis of polymer samples in size exclusion chromatography. Other types of information that can be gathered from differential refractometers are:

=== Molecular Weight ===
Since the molecular weight (or extent of polymerization) of a solute will correspond to a specific refractive index increment, the relationship between increasing solute weight and refractive index increment can be plotted to determine the exact molecular weight of an unknown solute.

=== Interactions with Solvent ===
Increasing addition of solute will alter the solvent's viscosity and polarizability, which cannot be measured by instruments that rely on low viscosity. Since differential refractometer is an external tool, the solvent viscosity does not pose a physical barrier to measurement, making them universal detectors.

=== General Shape ===
The shape of a solute will influence its induced dipole. This will affect the solvent polarizability, which affects the refractive index.

=== Practical Considerations ===
There are many practical factors that can affect the accuracy of a differential refractometer.

==== Solute Properties ====
When solutes are added to a solvent, they change the solution's optical density. The size, polarizability and shape and molecular structure of a solute all have effects on the refractive index of a solution. Generally, a Gaussian distribution is observed, although deviations occur.

==== Temperature ====
A controlled temperature is needed to ensure accurate measurements, as temperature affects many properties of a solution. If the temperature changes between measurements, this variance will be reflected in the measured refractive index.

==== Wavelength of Light ====
Cauchy's equation and Sellmeier equation describe the effect of wavelength on refractive index of medium.

== Applications ==
The use of and results from differential refractometers are valuable in numerous fields of science, with its theory and function applied in various research directions, including drug analysis and nanoparticle tracking.

The nature of refractive indexes allows RIDs to be used in conjunction with additional analytical chemistry instruments. Following the use of other machines, differential refractometers can immediately (further) characterize compounds eluting from chromatographs, spectrometers, and detectors, including:

- High Performance Liquid Chromatography (HPLC)
- Ultraviolet-Visible Spectroscopy
- Mass Spectrometry
- Evaporative Light Scattering Detection (ELSD)
