= Multiangle light scattering =

Spectroscopy technique

Multiangle light scattering (MALS) describes a technique for measuring the light scattered by a sample into a plurality of angles. It is used for determining both the absolute molar mass and the average size of molecules in solution, by detecting how they scatter light. A collimated beam from a laser source is most often used, in which case the technique can be referred to as multiangle laser light scattering (MALLS). The insertion of the word laser was intended to reassure those used to making light scattering measurements with conventional light sources, such as Hg-arc lamps that low-angle measurements could now be made.

Until the advent of lasers and their associated fine beams of narrow width, the width of conventional light beams used to make such measurements prevented data collection at smaller scattering angles. In recent years, since all commercial light scattering instrumentation use laser sources, this need to mention the light source has been dropped and the term MALS is used throughout.

The "multi-angle" term refers to the detection of scattered light at different discrete angles as measured, for example, by a single detector moved over a range that includes the particular angles selected or an array of detectors fixed at specific angular locations. A discussion of the physical phenomenon related to this static light scattering, including some applications, data analysis methods and graphical representations associated therewith are presented.

== Background ==
The measurement of scattered light from an illuminated sample forms the basis of the so-called classical light scattering measurement. Historically, such measurements were made using a single detector rotated in an arc about the illuminated sample. The first commercial instrument (formally called a "scattered photometer") was the Brice-Phoenix light scattering photometer introduced in the mid-1950s and followed by the Sofica photometer introduced in the late 1960s.

Measurements were generally expressed as scattered intensities or scattered irradiance. Since the collection of data was made as the detector was placed at different locations on the arc, each position corresponding to a different scattering angle, the concept of placing a separate detector at each angular location of interest was well understood, though not implemented commercially until the late 1970s. Multiple detectors having different quantum efficiency have different response and hence needs to be normalized in this scheme. An interesting system based upon the use of high speed film was developed by Brunsting and Mullaney in 1974. It permitted the entire range of scattered intensities to be recorded on the film with a subsequent densitometer scan providing the relative scattered intensities. The then-conventional use of a single detector rotated about an illuminated sample with intensities collected at specific angles was called differential light scattering after the quantum mechanical term differential cross section, σ(θ) expressed in milli-barns/steradian. Differential cross section measurements were commonly made, for example, to study the structure of the atomic nucleus by scattering from them nucleons, such as neutrons. It is important to distinguish between differential light scattering and dynamic light scattering, both of which are referred to by the initials DLS. The latter refers to a technique that is quite different, measuring the fluctuation of scattered light due to constructive and destructive interference, the frequency being linked to the thermal motion, Brownian motion of the molecules or particles in solution or suspension.

A MALS measurement requires a set of ancillary elements. Most important among them is a collimated or focused light beam (usually from a laser source producing a collimated beam of monochromatic light) that illuminates a region of the sample. In modern instruments, the beam is generally plane-polarized perpendicular to the plane of measurement, though other polarizations may be used especially when studying anisotropic particles. Earlier measurements, before the introduction of lasers, were performed using focused, though unpolarized, light beams from sources such as Hg-arc lamps. Another required element is an optical cell to hold the sample being measured. Alternatively, cells incorporating means to permit measurement of flowing samples may be employed. If single-particles scattering properties are to be measured, a means to introduce such particles one-at-a-time through the light beam at a point generally equidistant from the surrounding detectors must be provided.

Although most MALS-based measurements are performed in a plane containing a set of detectors usually equidistantly placed from a centrally located sample through which the illuminating beam passes, three-dimensional versions also have been developed wherein the detectors lie on the surface of a sphere with the sample controlled to pass through its center where it intersects the path of the incident light beam passing along a diameter of the sphere. The former framework is used for measuring aerosol particles while the latter was used to examine marine organisms such as phytoplankton.

The traditional differential light scattering measurement was virtually identical to the currently used MALS technique. Although the MALS technique generally collects multiplexed data sequentially from the outputs of a set of discrete detectors, the earlier differential light scattering measurement also collected data sequentially as a single detector was moved from one collection angle to the next. The MALS implementation is of course much faster, but the same types of data are collected and are interpreted in the same manner. The two terms thus refer to the same concept. For differential light scattering measurements, the light scattering photometer has a single detector whereas the MALS light scattering photometer generally has a plurality of detectors.

Another type of MALS device was developed in 1974 by Salzmann et al. based on a light pattern detector invented by George et al. for Litton Systems Inc. in 1971. The Litton detector was developed for sampling the light energy distribution in the rear focal-plane of a spherical lens for sampling geometric relationships and the spectral density distribution of objects recorded on film transparencies.

The application of the Litton detector by Salzman et al. provided measurement at 32 small scattering angles between 0° and 30°, and averaging over a broad range of azimuthal angles as the most important angles are the forward angles for static light scattering. By 1980, Bartholi et al. had developed a new approach to measuring the scattering at discrete scattering angles by using an elliptical reflector to permit measurement at 30 polar angles over the range 2.5° ≤ θ ≤ 177.5° with a resolution of 2.1°.

The commercialization of multiangle systems began in 1977 when Science Spectrum, Inc. patented a flow-through capillary system for a customized bioassay system developed for the USFDA. The first commercial MALS instrument incorporating 8 discrete detectors was delivered to S.C. Johnson and Son, by Wyatt Technology Company, in 1983, followed in 1984 with the sale of the first 15 detector flow instrument (Dawn-F) to AMOCO. By 1988, a three-dimensional configuration was introduced specifically to measure the scattering properties of single aerosol particles. At about the same time, the underwater device was built to measure the scattered light properties of single phytoplankton. Signals were collected by optical fibers and transmitted to individual photomultipliers. Around December 2001, an instrument was commercialized, which measures 7 scattering angles using a CCD detector (BI-MwA: Brookhaven Instruments Corp, Hotlsville, NY).

The literature associated with measurements made by MALS photometers is extensive. both in reference to batch measurements of particles/molecules and measurements following fractionation by chromatographic means such as size exclusion chromatography (SEC), reversed phase chromatography (RPC), and field flow fractionation (FFF).

== Theory ==
The interpretation of scattering measurements made at the multiangular locations relies upon some knowledge of the a priori properties of the particles or molecules measured. The scattering characteristics of different classes of such scatterers may be interpreted best by application of an appropriate theory. For example, the following theories are most often applied.

Rayleigh scattering is the simplest and describes elastic scattering of light or other electromagnetic radiation by objects much smaller than the incident wavelength. This type of scattering is responsible for the blue color of the sky during the day and is inversely proportional to the fourth power of wavelength.

The Rayleigh–Gans approximation is a means of interpreting MALS measurements with the assumption that the scattering particles have a refractive index, n_{1}, very close to the refractive index of the surrounding medium, n_{0}. If we set m = n_{1}/n_{0} and assume that |m - 1| << 1, then such particles may be considered as composed of very small elements, each of which may be represented as a Rayleigh-scattering particle. Thus each small element of the larger particle is assumed to scatter independently of any other.

Lorenz–Mie theory is used to interpret the scattering of light by homogeneous spherical particles. The Rayleigh–Gans approximation and the Lorenz–Mie theory produce identical results for homogeneous spheres in the limit as |1 − m| → 0.

Lorenz–Mie theory may be generalized to spherically symmetric particles per reference. More general shapes and structures have been treated by Erma.

Scattering data is usually represented in terms of the so-called excess Rayleigh ratio defined as the Rayleigh ratio of the solution or single particle event from which is subtracted the Rayleigh ratio of the carrier fluid itself and other background contributions, if any. The Rayleigh Ratio measured at a detector lying at an angle θ and subtending a solid angle ΔΩ is defined as the intensity of light per unit solid angle per unit incident intensity, I_{0}, per unit illuminated scattering volume ΔV. The scattering volume ΔV from which scattered light reaches the detector is determined by the detector's field of view generally restricted by apertures, lenses and stops. Consider now a MALS measurement made in a plane from a suspension of N identical particles/molecules per ml illuminated by a fine beam of light produced by a laser. Assuming that the light is polarized perpendicular to the plane of the detectors. The scattered light intensity measured by the detector at angle θ in excess of that scattered by the suspending fluid would be

$$I(\theta ) = \frac{{I_0 N\Delta V}} {{(kr)^2}}i(\theta )$$,

where i(θ) is the scattering function of a single particle, k = 2πn_{0}/λ_{0}, n_{0} is the refractive index of the suspending fluid, and λ_{0} is the vacuum wavelength of the incident light. The excess Rayleigh ratio, R(θ), is then given by

$$R(\theta ) = \frac{{I(\theta )r^2}}{{I_0 \Delta V}} = Ni(\theta )/k^2$$.

Even for a simple homogeneous sphere of radius a whose refractive index, n, is very nearly the same as the refractive index "n_{0}" of the suspending fluid, i.e. Rayleigh–Gans approximation, the scattering function in the scattering plane is the relatively complex quantity

$i(\theta ) = \frac{{k^2 V^2 \left| {m - 1} \right|^2}}{{4\pi ^2}}G^2 \left( {2ka\sin \frac{\theta }{2}} \right)$, where
$G(\xi ) = \frac{3}{{\xi ^2}}(\sin \xi - \xi \cos \xi )$, $k = \frac{{2\pi n_0}}{{\lambda _0}}$, $V = \frac{4}{3}\pi a^3$

and λ_{0} is the wavelength of the incident light in vacuum.

== Applications ==
=== Zimm plot and batch collection ===
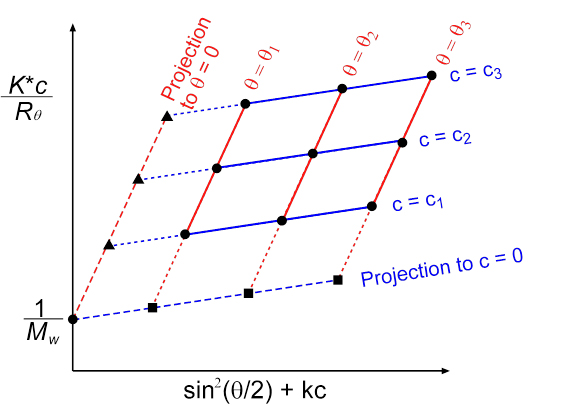
Zimm plot

MALS is most commonly used for the characterization of mass and size of molecules in solution. Early implementations of MALS such as those discussed by Bruno H. Zimm in his paper "Apparatus and Methods for Measurement and Interpretation of the Angular Variation of Light Scattering; Preliminary Results on Polystyrene Solutions" involved using a single detector rotated about a sample contained within a transparent vessel. MALS measurements from non-flowing samples such as this are commonly referred to as "batch measurements". By creating samples at several known low concentrations and detecting scattered light about the sample at varying angles, one can create a Zimm plot by plotting :$\frac{K^*c}{R_\theta}$ vs $\sin^2\frac{\theta }{2} + kc$ where c is the concentration of the sample and k is a stretch factor used to put kc and $\sin^2\frac{\theta }{2}$ into the same numerical range.

=== SEC and flow mode ===
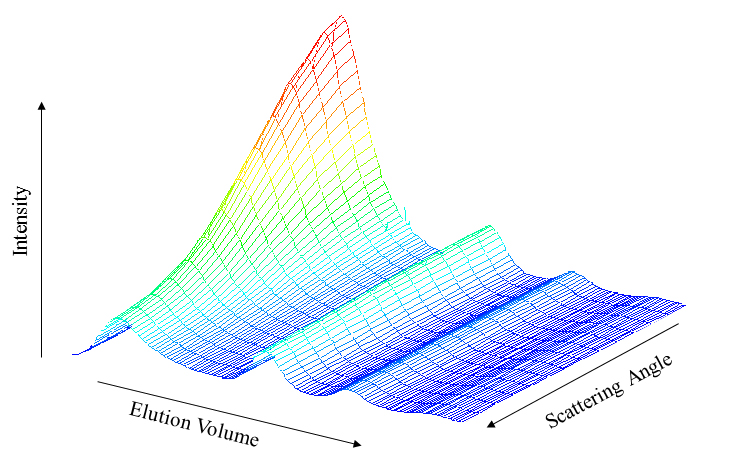
MALS signals for polystyrene spheres

With the advent of size exclusion chromatography (SEC), MALS measurements began to be used in conjunction with an on-line concentration detector to determine absolute molar mass and size of sample fractions eluting from the column, rather than depending on calibration techniques. These flow mode MALS measurements have been extended to other separation techniques such as field flow fractionation, ion exchange chromatography, and reversed-phase chromatography.

The angular dependence of light scattering data is shown below in a figure of mix of polystyrene spheres which was separated by SEC. The two smallest samples (farthest to the right) eluted last and show no angular dependence. The sample, second to the right shows a linear angular variation with the intensity increasing at lower scattering angles. The largest sample, on the left, elutes first and shows non-linear angular variation.

=== Utility of MALS measurements ===
==== Molar mass and size ====
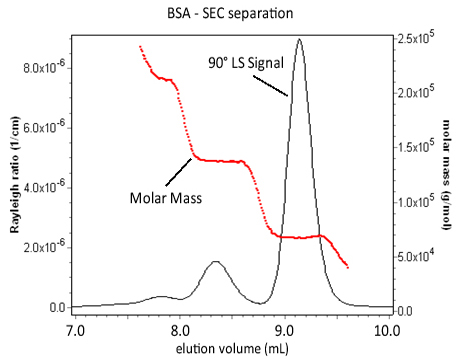
BSA Separation and MM distribution

Coupling MALS with an in-line concentration detector following a sample separation means like SEC permits the calculation of the molar mass of the eluting sample in addition to its root-mean-square radius. The figure below represents a chromatographic separation of BSA aggregates. The 90° light scattering signal from a MALS detector and the molar mass values for each elution slice are shown.

==== Molecular interactions ====
As MALS can provide molar mass and size of molecules, it permits study into protein-protein binding, oligomerization and the kinetics of self-assembly, association and dissociation. By comparing the molar mass of a sample to its concentration, one can determine the binding affinity and stoichiometry of interacting molecules.

==== Branching and molecular conformation ====
The branching ratio of a polymer relates to the number of branch units in a randomly branched polymer and the number of arms in star-branched polymers and was defined by Zimm and Stockmayer as

$g=\frac{R^2_b}{R^2_l}$

Where $R^2$ is the mean square radius of branched and linear macromolecules with identical molar masses. By utilizing MALS in conjunction with a concentration detector as described above, one create a log-log plot of the root-mean-square radius vs molar mass. The slope of this plot yields the branching ratio, g.

In addition to branching, the log-log plot of size vs. molar mass indicates the shape or conformation of a macromolecule. An increase in the slope of the plot indicates a variation in conformation of a polymer from spherical to random coil to linear. Combining the mean-square radius from MALS with the hydrodynamic radius $r_h$ attained from DLS measurements yields the shape factor ρ = $\frac{r_g}{r_h}$, for each macromolecular size fraction.

==== Other applications ====
Other MALS applications include nanoparticle sizing, protein aggregation studies, protein-protein interactions, electrophoretic mobility or zeta potential. MALS techniques have been adopted for the study of pharmaceutical drug stability, crystal nucleation and crystallization kinetics and use in nanomedicine.
