= List of dust storms =

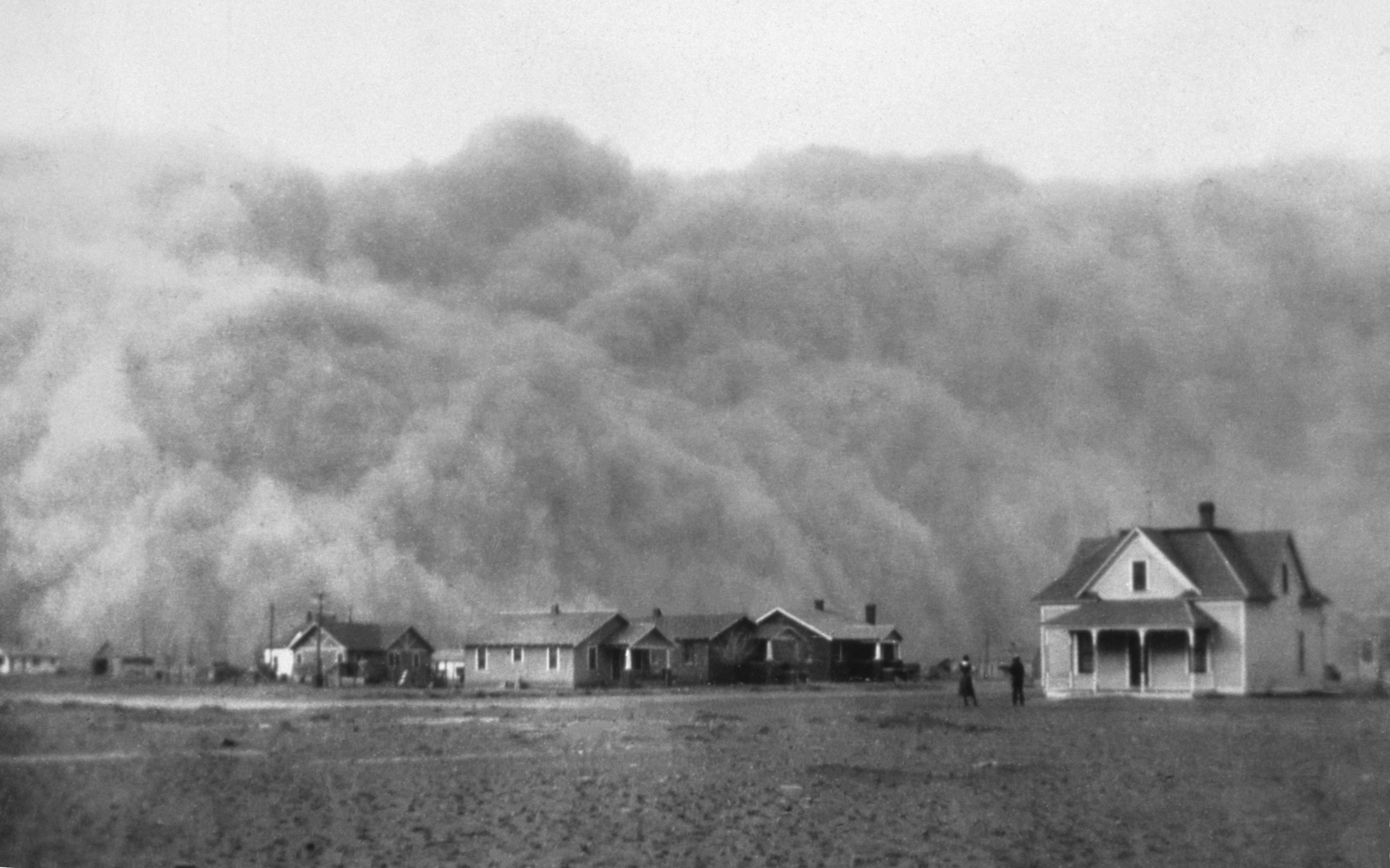
Black Sunday approaching Stratford, Texas

This is a list of significant dust storms.

Name	Date	Affected regions
Black Sunday	April 14, 1935, during the Dust Bowl	Texas Panhandle to the Oklahoma Panhandle, United States (Note: The prevalent months for a National Weather Service dust storm warning to be issued for a dust storm originating from the Texas South Plains area is during the months of October through June--the least likely being the summer months of July through September.)
Great Bakersfield Dust Storm of 1977	December 19–21, 1977	Southern San Joaquin Valley, California
1983 Melbourne dust storm	February 8, 1983	Victoria, Australia
1991 Interstate 5 dust storm	November 29, 1991	San Joaquin Valley, California
2009 Australian dust storm	September 23, 2009	South Australia to inland New South Wales, Australia
2010 China drought and dust storms	Spring 2010	China and parts of Southeast Asia
2014 Tehran dust storm	June 2, 2014	Tehran, Iran
2018 Indian dust storms		
2021 East Asia sandstorm	March 2021	Mongolia, China and South Korea
2022 Iraq dust storms		Iraq
2023 East Asia sandstorm	April 2023	China, Japan, South Korea and Thailand
2025 Chicago dust storm	May 16, 2025	Chicago, Illinois, United States

== See also ==
- Dust Bowl, a period of severe dust storms in the 1930s affecting the United States and Canada
