= 1991 Interstate 5 dust storm =

U.S. interstate highway disaster

Coordinates: 36.545857°N 120.507895°W

The 1991 Interstate 5 dust storm was a dust storm which occurred on November 29, 1991, along Interstate 5 (I-5) north of the city of Coalinga, California. The storm caused a 104-vehicle traffic collision on the highway which killed 17 people and injured 150.

== Background ==
The San Joaquin Valley, in which Coalinga is located, is a major agricultural region of California. The region had historically suffered from dust storms; the Great Bakersfield Dust Storm of 1977 occurred in a different part of the valley, and a series of smaller dust storms killed seven people in crashes on the same section of Interstate 5 in 1978. At the time of the collision, the valley was undergoing its sixth year of a serious drought; as a result, its rainy season had not yet begun, creating unusually dusty conditions. Fields near the crash site had been left fallow during the planting season; as a result, they were covered in dust from plowing, but did not have crops to block the spread of the dust.

== The storm ==
High winds and blowing dust were reported throughout central California on November 29, 1991, both in the San Joaquin Valley and the Salinas Valley. A weather station at Naval Air Station Lemoore, the closest one to the crash site which tracked wind and visibility statistics, measured wind gusts up to 21.6 metres per second (48 mph; 78 km/h) and visibility as low as 0.5 kilometers (0.31 mi). In some parts of the valley, including along I-5, narrow plumes of dust made local visibility conditions even worse than those measured. Collision victims described the rapid onset of near zero visibility conditions, and California Lieutenant Governor Leo McCarthy reported the presence of 60 miles per hour (97 km/h; 27 m/s) winds in a briefing the day after the collision.

== The collisions ==
November 29 was the Friday after Thanksgiving in 1991, and traffic on I-5 was heavier throughout the day as a result. Around 2:30 PM local time, the low visibility on the highway caused a series of chain reaction collisions roughly 45 miles (72 km) north of Coalinga. The collisions mainly occurred in five groups spread across 1.5 miles (2.4 km) of highway; while one 20-car pile-up occurred in the northbound lanes, the remainder of the crashes were in the southbound lanes. In total, 104 vehicles were involved in collisions, including 93 cars and 11 semi-trailer trucks. 150 miles (240 km) of I-5 was closed for a day following the collisions.

17 people died in the collisions, and an additional 150 people were injured. Several vehicles caught fire, which contributed to the casualties; two bodies were burned so badly that they could not be identified in the aftermath of the crash. The dust storm also impeded the emergency response to the collisions; a fire truck and an ambulance were involved in separate collisions while attempting to reach the collision site. Nonetheless, first responders were able to access the remote site within half an hour of the crash.

According to the California Highway Patrol, the crash was the deadliest collision caused by a dust storm in state history. A report in the Deseret News described it as the largest vehicle crash in then-recent history in terms of the number of vehicles involved.
