= Microspherulite =

Microspherulites are microscopic spherical particles with diameter less than two mm, usually in the 100 micrometre range, mainly consisting of mineral material (the Greek litos means "stone"). Only bodies created by natural physico-chemical processes, with no contribution of either biological (in aqueous sedimentary environments this contribution is possible) or human activity, are considered to be microspherulites. Generally speaking, the common feature (sphericity) indicates that each sphere represents an internal equilibrium of forces within a fluid medium (water, air).

== Classification ==
Several types of these forms are found in nature. Depending on the formational environment, microspherulites can be classed as oolites, micrometeorites, impact spherulites, iberulites, pisolites, aerolites, chondrules, biolites, pellets, bubbles, or carbonaceous microspherules.

=== Aqueous environment ===
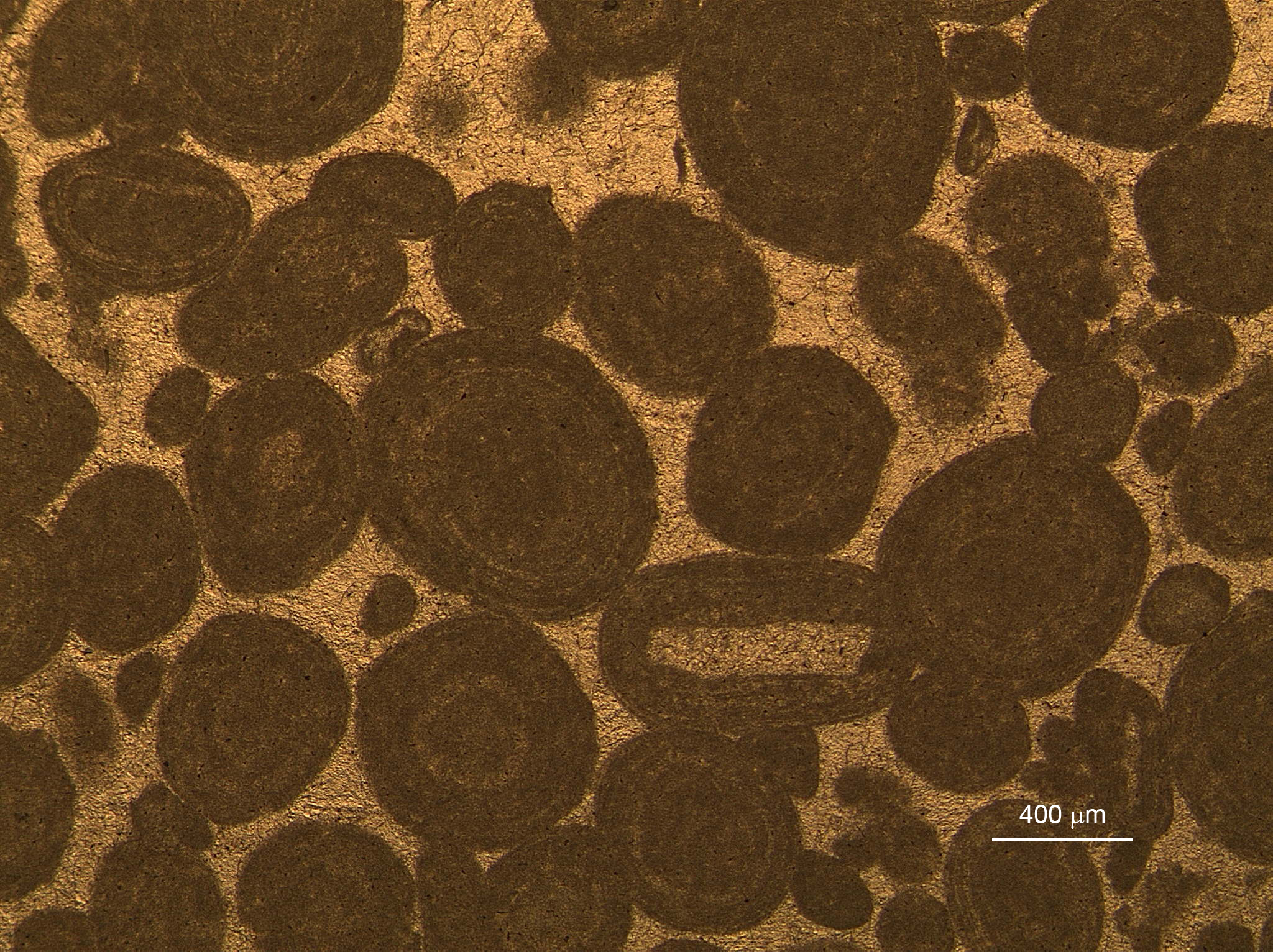
Figure 1: Oolites observed with a transmitted light microscope.

- Oolites are internally structured spheres, composed mainly by calcium carbonate (Figure 1). They are a type of constituent in limestone. The size of these ooids ranges between 0.25 and 2 mm. The name derives from the Greek ooion (egg). They are formed by growing larger and accreting material as they move around. They accomplish this either (a) by physical attachment of fine-grained material as they roll around, much in the manner of a snowball, and (b) by the chemical precipitation of material in solution, much as salt crystallizes from water during evaporation. In the former case they have thin concentric layers, and in the latter they have radiating sprays of crystals. However, a combination of both processes can be found. Microbes could contribute to their development.

=== Aerial environment ===
- Micrometeorites are typically metallic microspherules (iron or iron and nickel) but can also be formed by silicate minerals, whose dimensions must range from tens of micrometres to one millimetre. They correspond to pieces of extraterrestrial meteoroids, resulting from melting and vaporization during entry into the Earth’s atmosphere. During this melt stage a significant loss of mass can occur through holes in their surface. The degree of heating and their original composition determine that only a few minerals have been founded in micrometeorites. They have not yet been properly classified.
- Impact spherulites occur when a large extraterrestrial object strikes Earth at cosmic velocity, melts and vaporizes, silicate materials can condense into high spheroidal, sand-sized particles deposited around the point of impact. Unaltered impact spherulites consist entirely of glass (microtektites) or a combination of glass and crystals grown in flight (microkrystites). Primary crystals are only common in microspherulites from two Phanerozoic impact layers: the Upper Eocene microkrystite or clinopyroxene spherule layer and the Cretaceous-Paleogene boundary (K/T boundary) layer. Other crystalline phases may be olivine, Fe-rich pyroxene, spinels and feldspars. Frequently the crystals are replaced by diagenetic phases such as goethite, pyrite, glauconite, K-feldspars, quartz, sericite, chlorite, and carbonates.

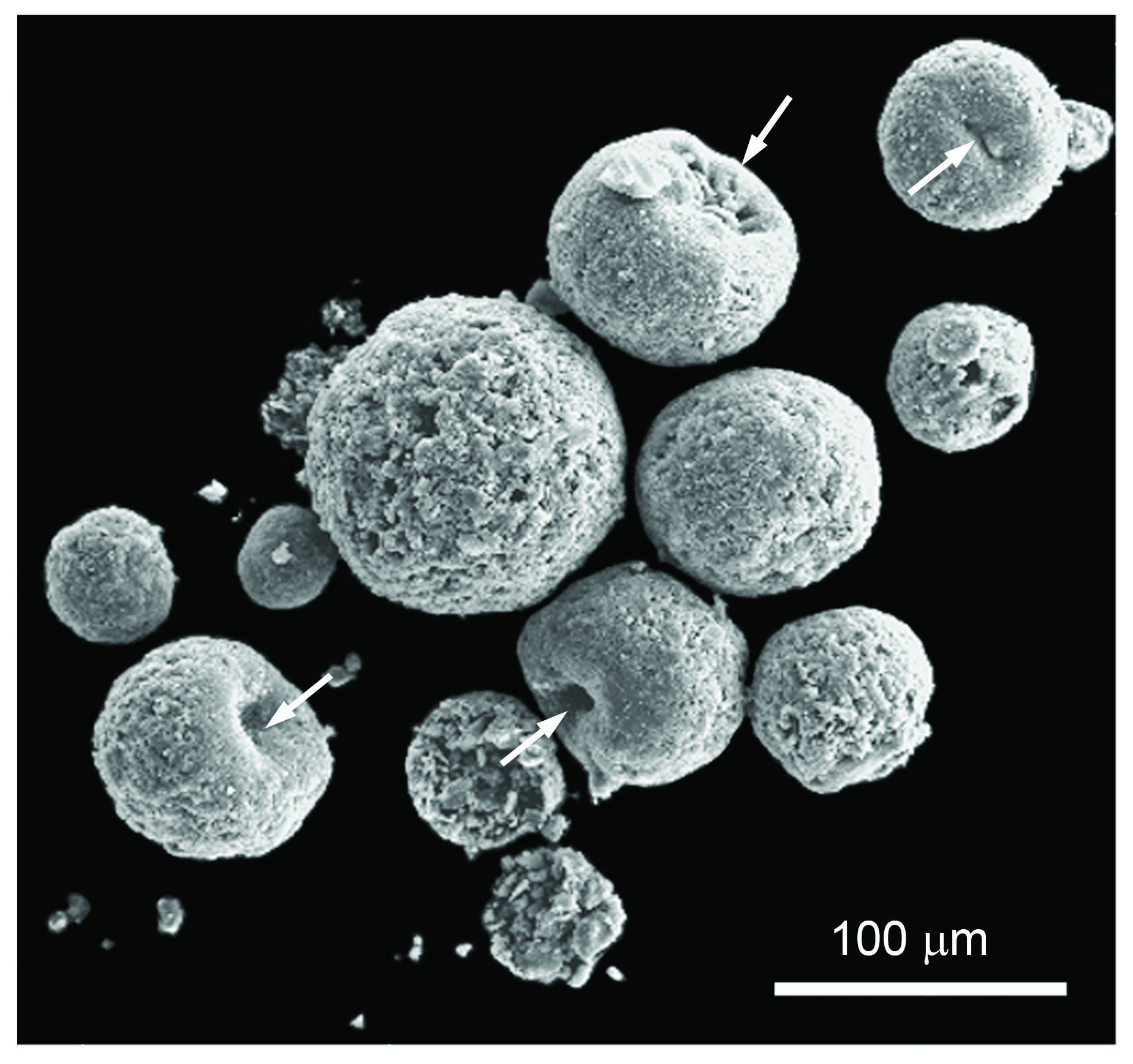
Figure 2: Group of iberulites observed under Scanning Electron Microscope (SEM). The arrows show vortex position.

- Iberulites are co-associations of well-defined minerals, together with non-crystalline compounds, with axial geometry and a characteristic depression (vortex), structured around a coarse-grained core with a smectite rind, and pinkish colour (Figure 2). They are formed at present in the troposphere by complex aerosol-water-gas interactions. The modal size is in the 60-90 micrometre range, and the shapes are almost perfect spheres. Their name comes from the Iberian Peninsula, indicating the place where they were discovered. They are related to intrusions of aerosol plumes from the Sahara desert. The mineralogy of the core (tens of micrometres thick) is commonly formed by quartz, calcite, dolomite and feldspars, while the most frequent minerals of the rind (a few micrometres thick) are clay minerals, mainly smectites (beidellite, montmorillonite) and illite, amorphous silica and impregnation of sulfate minerals (mainly gypsum, alunite and jarosite) and chlorides.

== Other related terms ==
- Pisolites are spheroidal particles, larger in size and commonly more distorted than ooids. The name derives from the Greek pisos (pea). Mineral concentrations (bauxites, limonites, siderites) and the pedogenic caliches (subaerial environment) can have pisolitic structure. They usually reach 5–8 mm in diameter and for this reason they can not strictly be considered microspherulites. Dunham (1969) considered them associated to caliches, while Pray and Esteban (1977) suggested they were formed by inorganic precipitation from brines.
- Aerolite is a generic term indicating lithogenic elements gathered from the atmosphere. This term does not imply sphericity or microscopic size.
- Chondrules are the microscopic constituents of chondrites that represent 80% of the meteorites that fall to the Earth per the Meteoritical Society. Chondrules range in diameter from a few micrometres to over 1 cm. They are formed by rapid heating of solid precursor material and subsequent melting, followed by slow cooling. Their main composition is silicate minerals such as olivine and pyroxene, surrounded by feldspars (crystalline or glassy); minor minerals are Fe-sulfide, metallic Fe-Ni and oxides.
- Biolites are biologically produced, many organisms can produce mineral particles dubbed in general biolites. Their shape, size and composition may be very varied. As examples we can cite otolites (compounds of the vestibular system of the inner ear) and the calculi resulting from various histopathologies. Studies have confirmed that microorganisms are able to precipitate minerals.
- Pellets are those homogeneous aggregates with no internal structure, consisting of micritic calcite, spherical to ellipsoidal in shape and with sizes between 0.03 and 0.15 mm. They are thought to be faecal particles from aquatic organisms.

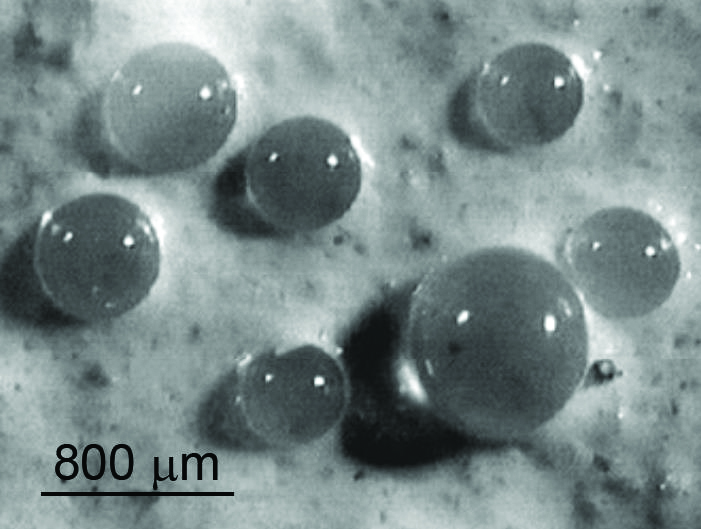
Figure 3: Solid glass microspheres used like ingredients in road and street signaling paintings.

- Bubbles include frequently unstable spherules which may be produced by the dispersion of two immiscible fluids forming an emulsion. Usually this term is applied to air-water emulsions, but it is also valid for water-air (hazes, drops) or other liquid fluids (oil-water).
- Carbonaceous microspherules are a type of soot particle floating in the atmosphere, produced by anthropogenic combustion processes of fuels, and may be coated with a layer of adsorbed hydrocarbons, sulfates or both. These particles are hollow microspherules that are black in colour, and made up of carbon or graphite. The size ranges from tens to a hundred micrometres.
- Artefacts are spherules intentionally produced spherical particles for use in industry or medicine. The shape is often perfectly spherical, truly uniform and size ranging ~ 50 nm to 1000 nm (nanospheres), or 1 μm to 1000 μm (microspheres). They may be made up of organic-inorganic compounds and provided with different properties. In fact, commercially, microspheres can be found manufactured from materials such as glass, polymers (polyethylene, polystyrene) or ceramic. Microspheres can be solid or hollow, and so their density will be very different as well as their applications. Hollow microspheres usually are added to reduce the density of a material. Solid microspheres have numerous applications depending on their size and their manufacture material. Solid glass microspheres are used in fields such as roads and streets signaling (Figure 3). They are added to paintings used for traffic signs and roadway surface signaling to incorporate the retroreflective effect. So they improve the night visibility of the way.
