= Iberulite =

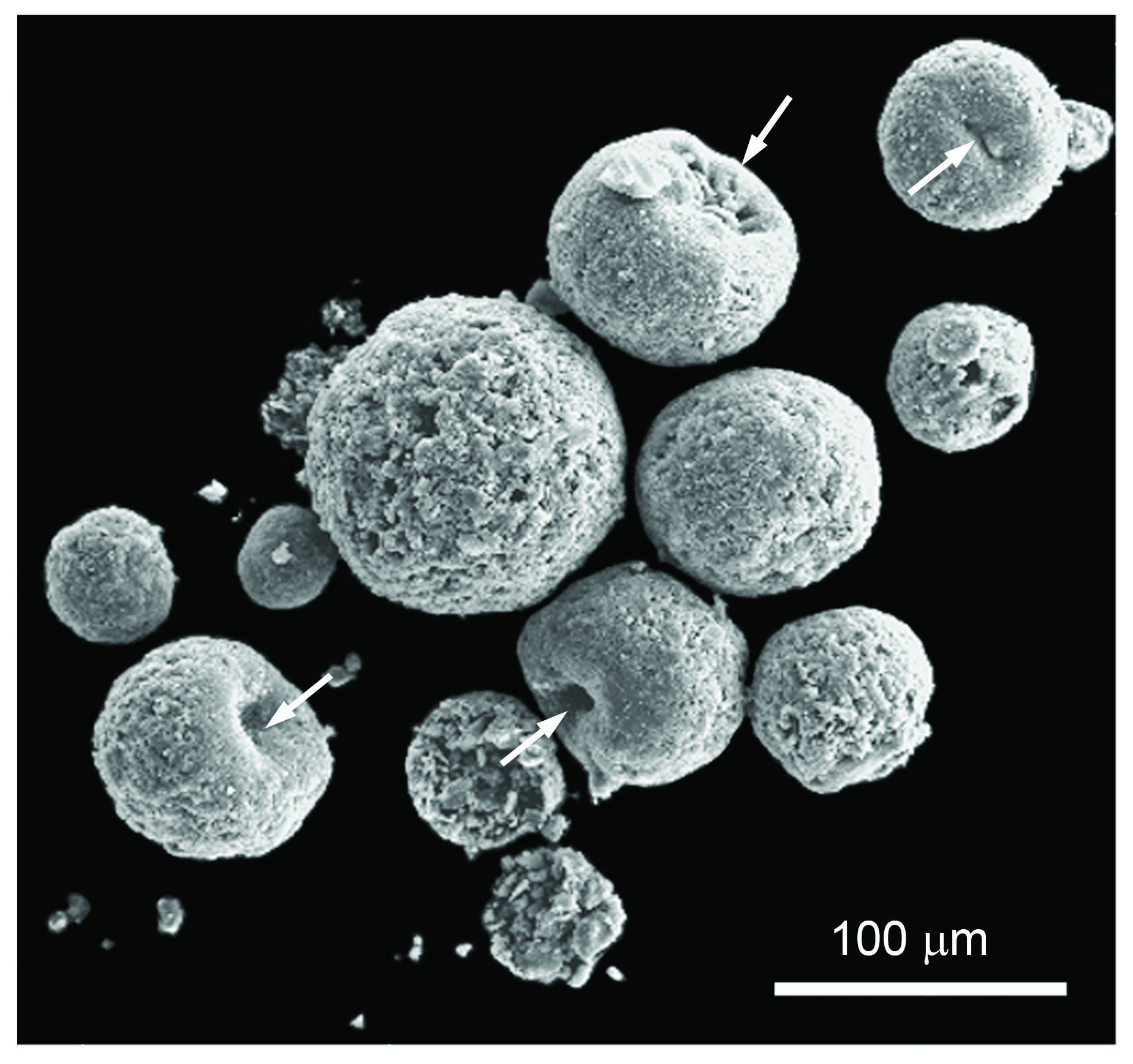
Fig. 1 Group of iberulites observed under SEM. The arrows show vortex position.

Iberulites are a particular type of microspherulites (Fig. 1) that develop in the atmosphere (troposphere), finally falling to the Earth's surface. The name comes from the Iberian Peninsula where they were discovered.

== Definition ==
An iberulite is a co-association (Note: Co-association: heterogeneous mixture of reactive mineral phases. These complex associations are typically formed in nature and are characterized by high surface area, low abundance of metal oxyhydroxide phases, and organic materials that act as cementing agents or surface coatings of prominent mineral grains.) with axial geometry, consisting of well-defined mineral grains, together with non-crystalline compounds, structured around a coarse-grained core with a smectite rind, only one vortex and pinkish color (Figs. 1-2), formed in the troposphere by complex aerosol-water-gas interactions.

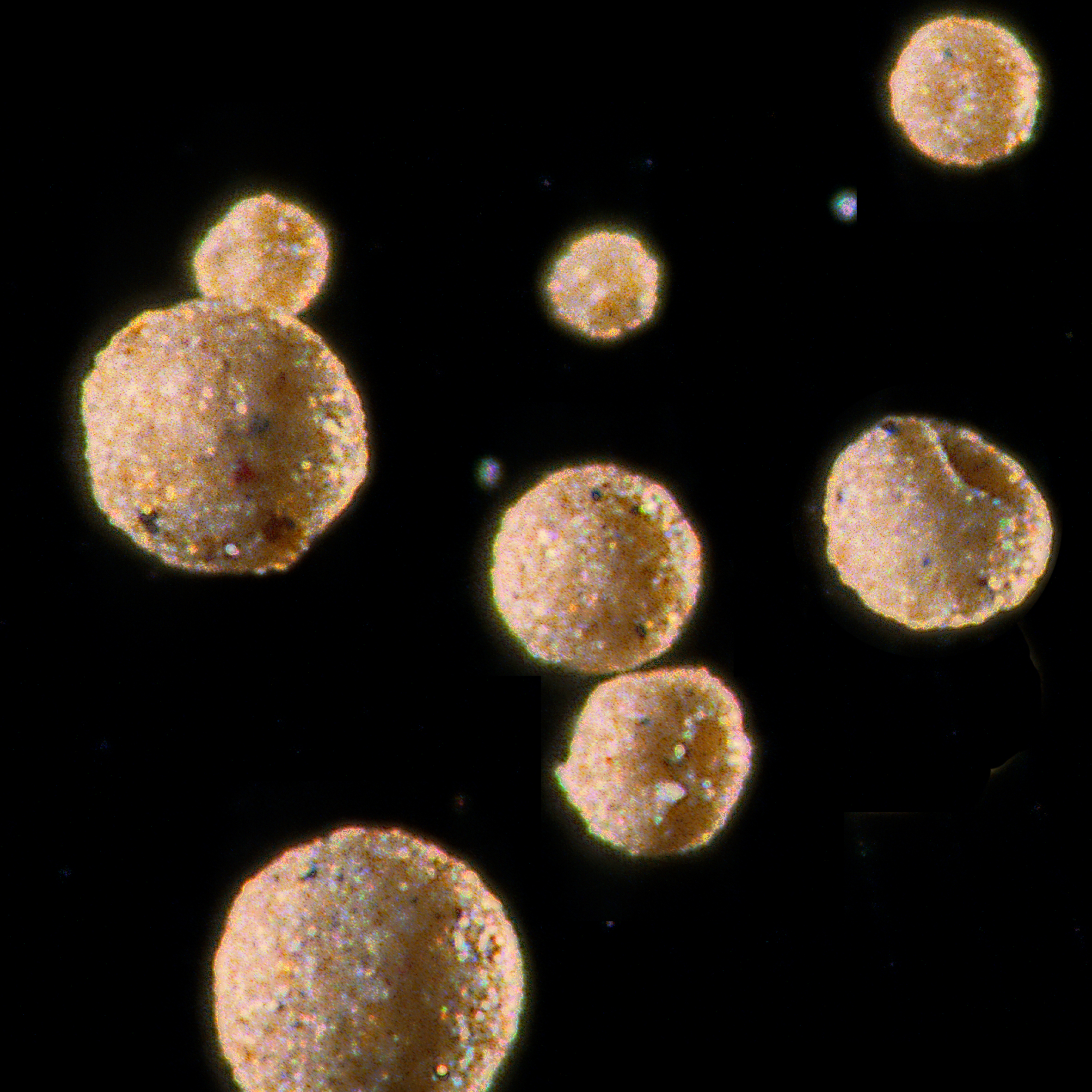
Fig. 2 Aspect of several iberulites under optical microscope.

=== Shape ===
These microspherulites are mostly spherical in shape (roundness index=0.95), with 60-90 μm modal diameter, although some particles can be up to 200 μm in diameter. According to this roundness index, these microspherules are really elongated spheroids with two axes defined along a polar plane and typically presenting a depression or vortex. The presence of plant filaments in the atmosphere can distort these shapes and sizes. In any case, these are uncommon “giant” aerosol particles.

=== Compositional attributes ===
Composition can be determined by both X-ray diffraction (XRD) and electronic microscopy techniques (mainly SEM, EDX, HRTEM). Sections show that the body of iberulites can be divided into core and rind. The core is mainly formed by grains of quartz, calcite, dolomite and feldspars. The rind shows clay minerals, mainly smectites (beidellite, montmorillonite) and illite, as well as sulfates, chlorides and amorphous silica. The latter group of minerals could be the result of neoformations during the maturation process occurring in the atmosphere during the final stages of iberulite formation. It is striking that sulphates only appear in the periphery of the iberulites. Flight over areas with anthropogenic or natural (volcanic, as those of North Atlantic archipelagos) (Note: Volcanic sulfur emissions: Sulfur and other gas emissions into the atmosphere from inside the Earth occur near volcanic areas. These emissions can come from both clearly visible (explosive) eruptions and from diffuse (or quiescent) emissions, and there is not a real consensus about the relative importance of the latter. At present, submarine volcanic emissions occur in the mid-ocean ridges, and also as intraplate volcanism (hotspots); subaerial terrestrial volcanism is related with destructive plate margins Convergent boundary, Plate tectonics, (volcanic arcs above subduction zones).) sulphur emissions probably adsorbs SO_{2} onto the iberulite surface. Descent to the marine boundary layer (MBL) (Note: Marine boundary layer: This is defined as that part of the troposphere directly influenced by the presence of the ocean's surface. It reacts with little diurnal variability, is 1–2 km thick (3 km max), has a low Bowen ratio and a significant wave state. The marine boundary layer (MBL) over the Earth's oceans plays a critical role in regulating surface energy and moisture fluxes and in controlling the convective transfer of energy and moisture to the free atmosphere.) of the Iberian-Moroccan Atlantic coast leads to the incorporation of sea salt and microorganisms. The iberulites eventually fall on the southern Iberian Peninsula, where they have been detected.

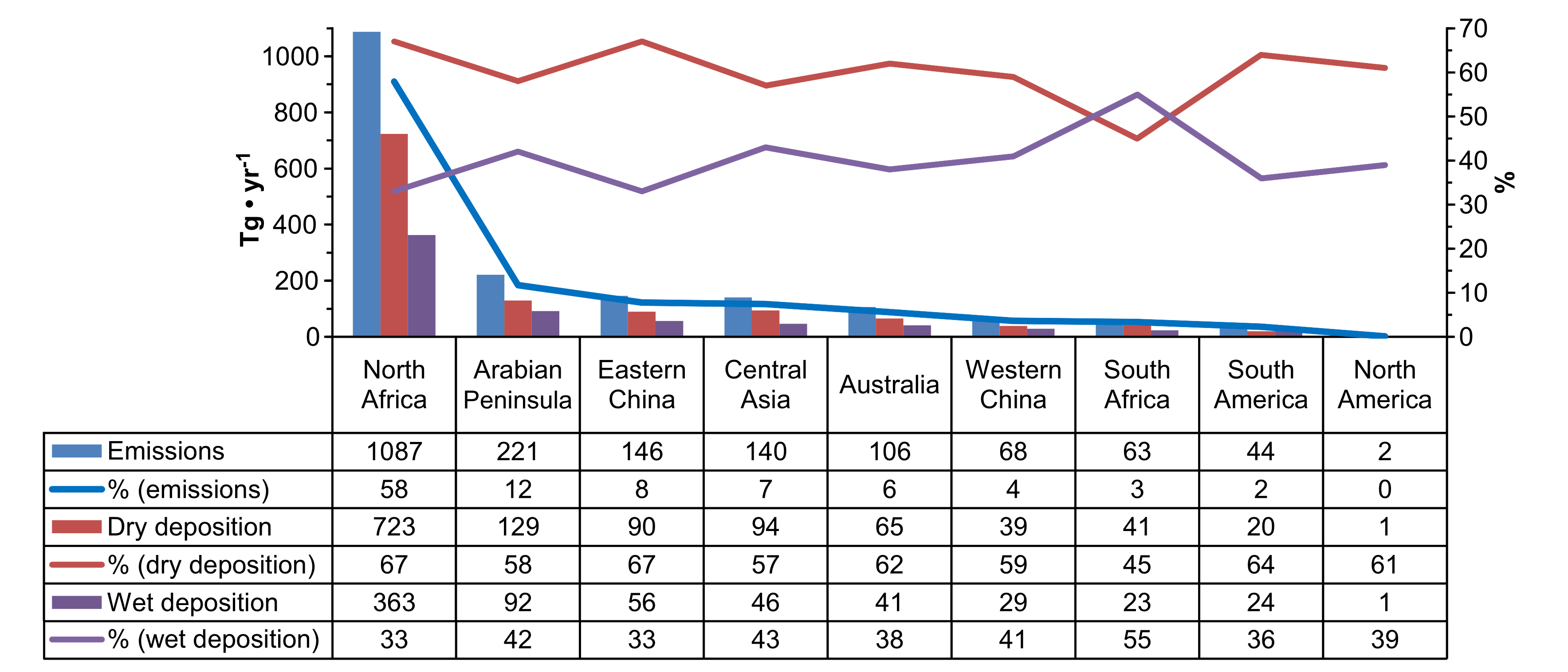
Fig. 3 Emissions and dry/wet deposition of aerosols.

== Formation ==
=== Geographical setting ===
Iberulites have as yet only been found in the southern Iberian Peninsula. This location is geographically close to North Africa and it is therefore influenced by the emissions of Saharan aerosols, which are the greatest contributor of particulate matter to the atmospheric global dust budget (Fig. 3).

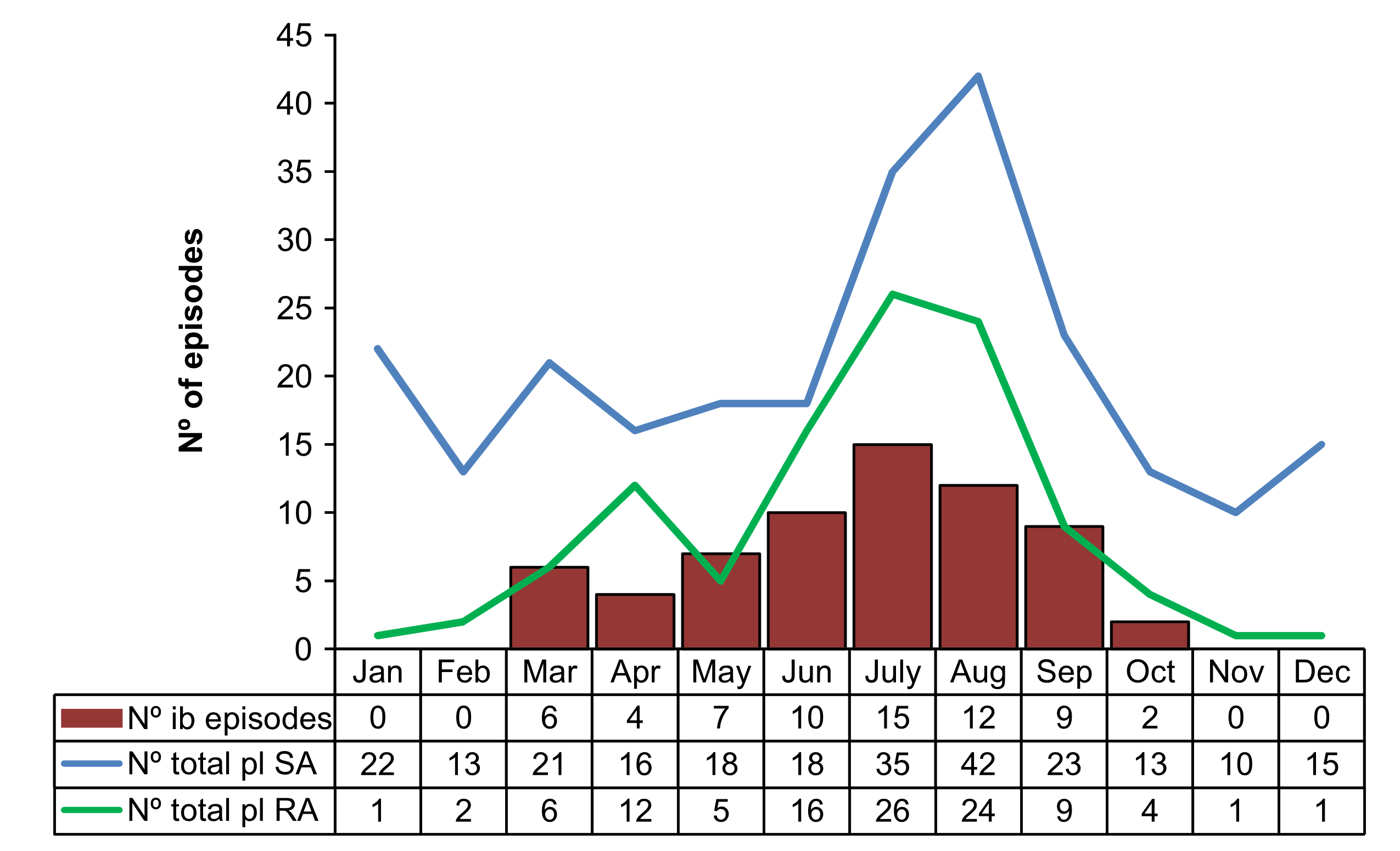
Fig. 4 Number of iberulite episodes (pl= plume, SA= Source Area, RA= Reception Area).

=== Saharan dust outbreaks and iberulites ===
The general content of aerosols in the atmosphere of the southern Iberian Peninsula is clearly related to the evolution of aerosols arriving from North Africa. Monitoring of dry aerosol deposition using passive samplers determined the formation of iberulites in two periods of the year (Fig. 4). The main depositional period occurs throughout the summer, while the second appears as a minor peak in early spring. However, the formation of iberulites is more specifically related with Saharan dust outbreaks, or dust plumes (Fig. 5) occurring within these two defined periods.

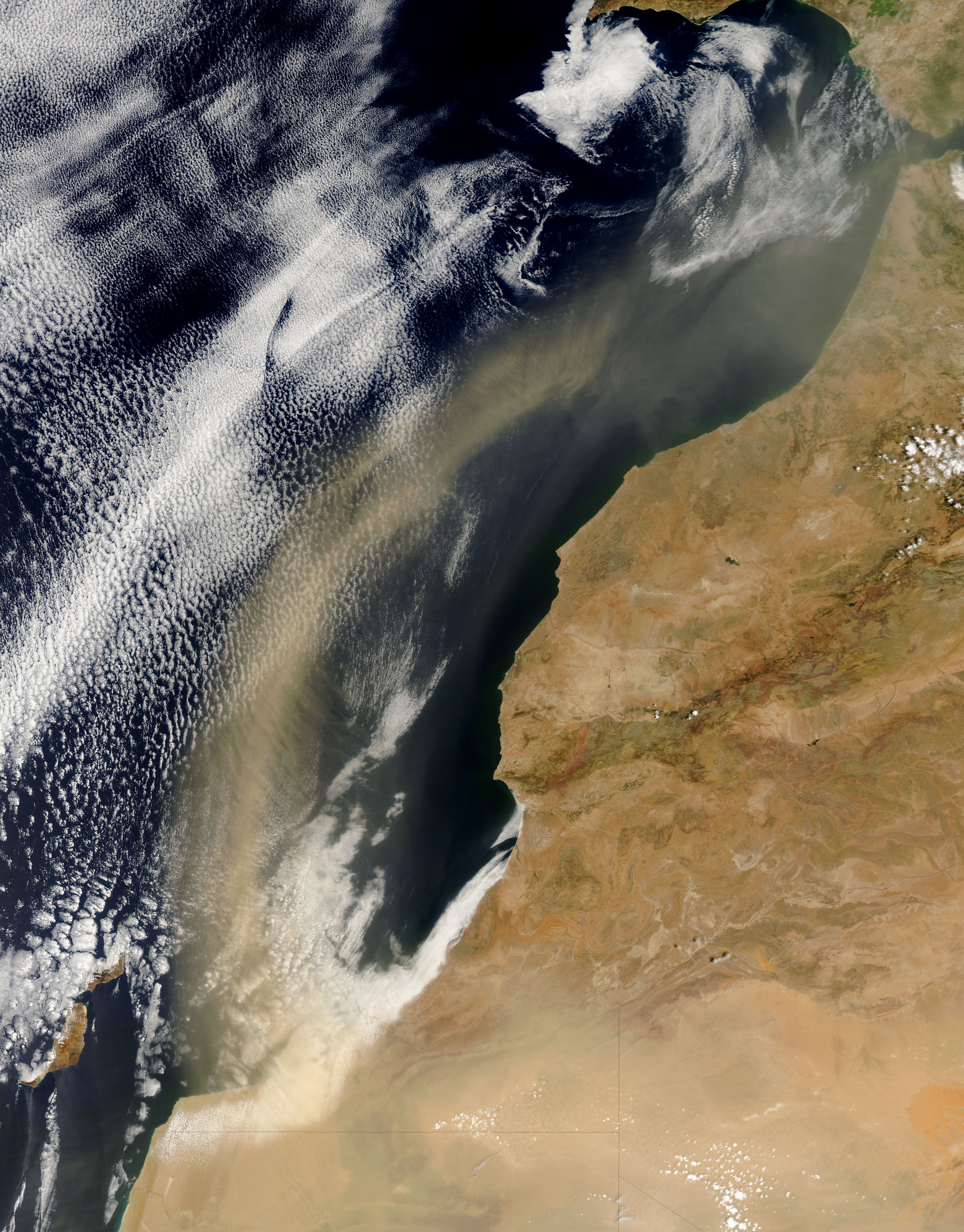
Fig. 5 Saharan dusty event occurring on August 15, 2005. Notice the change of direction of the plume towards the Cadiz Gulf.

=== Iberulites and red rains ===
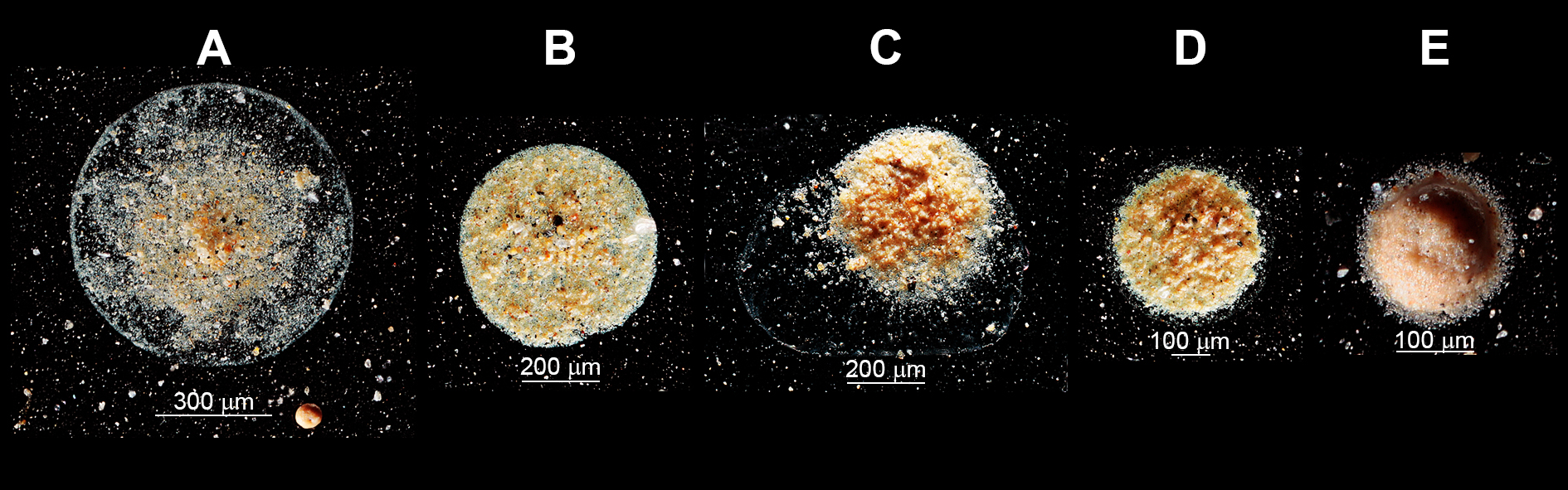
Fig. 6 Traces of waterdroplets during a Saharan dust event.

Short episodes of wet deposition (more specifically red rains) were observed during Saharan dust outbreaks over the period 2004-2013. Monitoring of these episodes led to the obtaining of a sequence of droplet impacts (Fig. 6) corresponding to June 6, 2012. This sequence would have begun with the formation of more or less aerosol-rich water droplets (or precursor water droplets) (Fig. 6A). The aerosol contents, together with dissolved salts (detected in this sequence as whitish or shiny precipitates), would have gradually increased, finally producing a well-defined iberulite after desiccation (Fig. 6E). The passage of these Saharan dust outbreaks over the study site had a total mean duration of five days (Fig. 7). It was observed during this passage that the central day presented the highest air temperatures and PM_{10} and PM_{2.5} (PM_{10}>PM_{2.5}) contents, whereas relative humidity decreased (RH). A relation was therefore established between monthly numbers of iberulite episodes and PM_{10} content-RH, which determined that clean atmospheres (<5 μg•m-3) with RH>65% do not present suitable conditions for iberulite formation.

=== Stages in the formation of iberulites ===
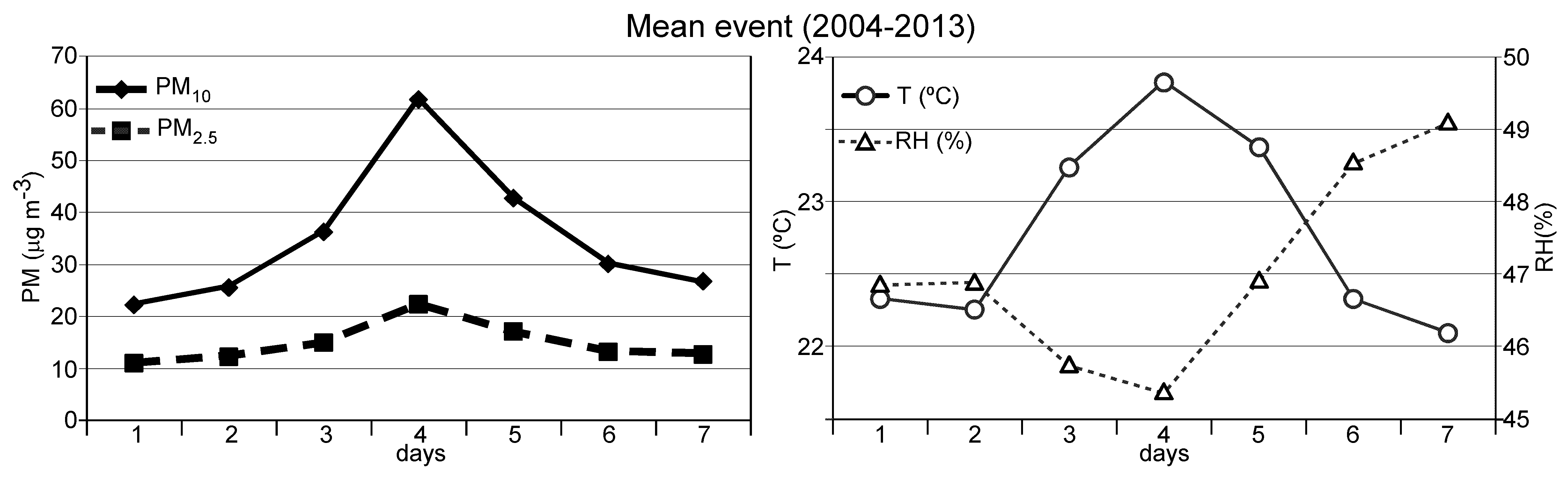
Fig. 7 Time evolution of the particulate matter / Time evolution of the relative humidity (RH) and temperature.

Iberulites are linked to the evolution of high-dust air masses (plumes) which, originating in Saharan dust storms, are transported over the Iberian Peninsula and often across the eastern North Atlantic Ocean. These plumes occur in the warm season (May to September), as a result of anticyclone activity affecting the Iberian Peninsula, and only sporadically in spring. Based on the relation between iberulites and red rain events, as well as the morphologies and compositional attributes observed, an aqueous interphase hypothesis has been suggested as the unitary mechanism for tropospheric formation of iberulites. Interactions between water droplets and Saharan aerosols create complex hydrodynamic conditions causing the possibility of collisions (wake capture and front capture) (Note: Wake capture: This is a mode of aerodynamic capture of a drop falling in the atmosphere. A large drop settling through smaller drops will sweep out a volume and their hydrodynamic flow fields interfere collecting aerosols/droplets with some efficiency by the wake, depending on size of drops and size of aerosols, being most efficient for large and giant aerosols due to high terminal velocity and cross-sectional area.) that originate the "precursor water droplets" of the iberulites. The movement of these water droplets to lower tropospheric levels implies either simultaneous or consecutive processes such as coalescence, formation of vortex and downdraught. During this phase the iberulites acquire their spherical shape and internal structure (core and rind), although sometimes this shape can be distorted.

There is an additional process of atmospheric maturation of iberulites that, in detail, only happens on the smectite rind, by means of heterogeneous and multiphase reactions (Note: Multiphase reactions: These refer to reactions involving components in different phases, and are a combination of simultaneous phase change and conversion of some materials into others. A general multiphase reaction generates three classes of fluxes: component mass sources, interphase mass transfer, interphase energy transfer.) producing sulfates as the result of H_{2}SO_{4} attack on the minerals of the rind. This would lead to the rapid transformation of some primary minerals into products of atmospheric neoformation (Note: Neoformation: This is the formation of new mineral species from previously existing ones through alteration of environmental conditions. The new minerals thus produced are therefore stable in the new conditions.) secondary minerals): the sulfates (mainly the gypsum) would be the product of H_{2}SO_{4} attack on the interlayer cations of the smectites, which would gradually destroy the octahedral and tetrahedral (Note: Tetrahedral, octahedral and interlayer sheets: The basic structural feature of the phyllosilicates is the stack of three types of layers: the tetrahedral sheet is formed by SiO_{4} tetrahedra, and each tetrahedron shares three of its vertex oxygen atoms with other tetrahedra and in which the Al can substitute up to half the Si. The octahedral sheet is made up by the Al, Fe and Mg cations, in six-coordination with the O and OH anions. Depending on the composition of the tetrahedral and octahedral sheets, the layer will have no charge, or will have a net negative charge. If the layers are charged this charge is balanced by interlayer cations such as Na^{+} or K^{+}. In each case the interlayer can also contain water. The crystal structure is formed from a stack of layers interspaced with the interlayers.) sheets of phyllosilicates creating mixed sulfates.

The alunite - jarosite found in the smectite rind would have a similar origin. If acid attack progresses further, the phyllosilicate grains would be completely destroyed, producing amorphous silica and releasing iron. Since biogenic exoskeletons have no signs of corrosion, they must have been incorporated after the acid attack described above, probably simultaneously with the incorporation of sea salt.

== See also ==
- Aerosol
- Dust storm
- Mineral dust
- Plume
- Red rain in Kerala
- Saharan Air Layer
- Troposphere
