= Black Sunday (storm) =

1935 dust storm in Oklahoma

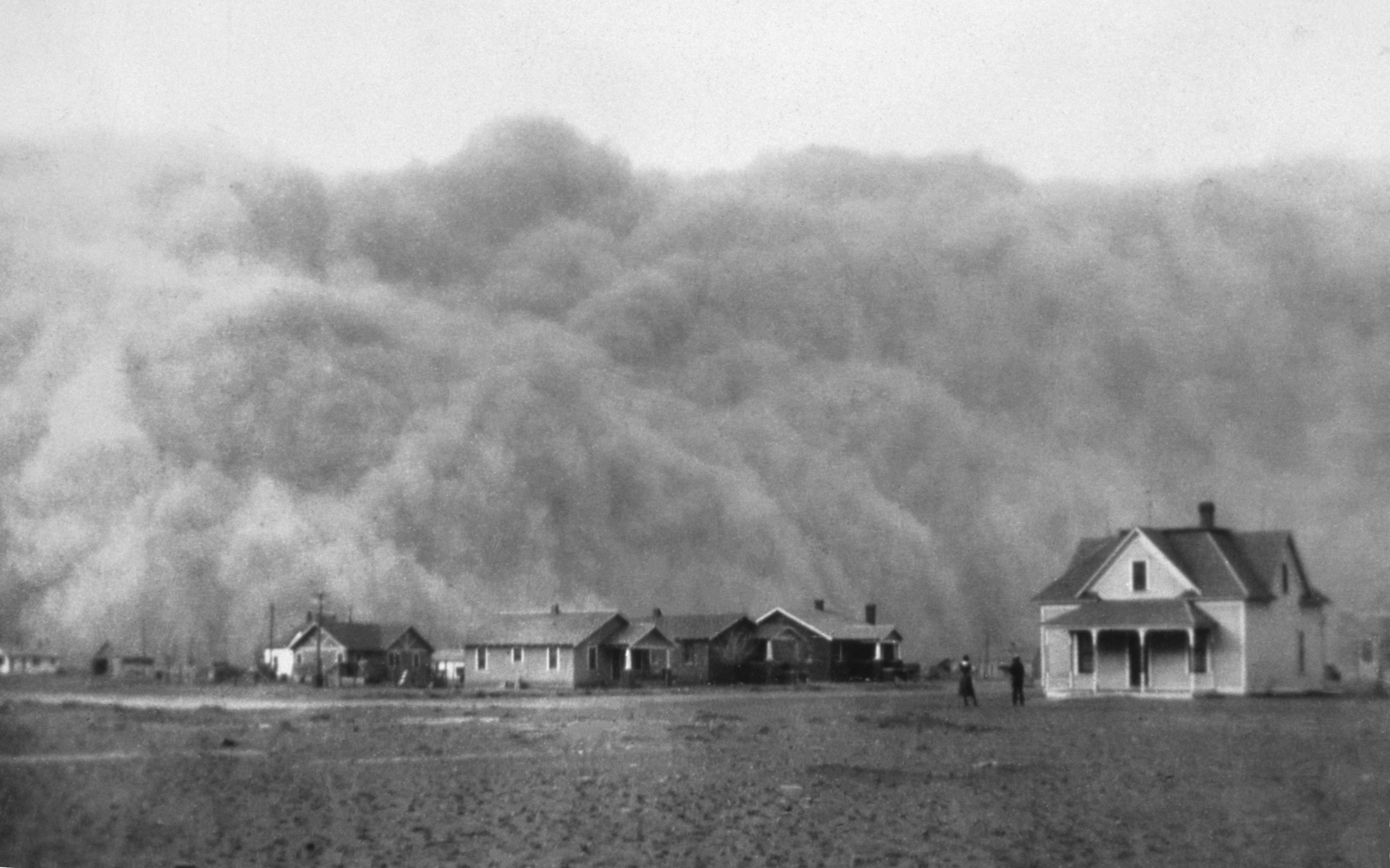
Black Sunday dust storm approaches Stratford, Texas, on April 14th, 1935.

Black Sunday was a particularly severe dust storm that occurred on April 14, 1935, as part of the Dust Bowl in the United States. It was one of the worst dust storms in American history and caused immense economic and agricultural damage. It is estimated that 300,000 tons of topsoil were displaced from the prairie area.

On the afternoon of April 14, 1935, residents of several plains states were forced to take cover as a dust storm or "black blizzard" blew through the region. The storm first hit the Oklahoma panhandle and northwestern Oklahoma before moving south for the day. It hit Beaver, Oklahoma, around 4 p.m.; Boise City around 5:15; and Amarillo, Texas, at 7:20. The conditions were the most severe in the Oklahoma and Texas panhandles, but the storm's effects were also felt in surrounding areas. Drought, erosion, bare soil, and winds caused the dust to fly freely and at high speeds.

== The Dust Bowl ==
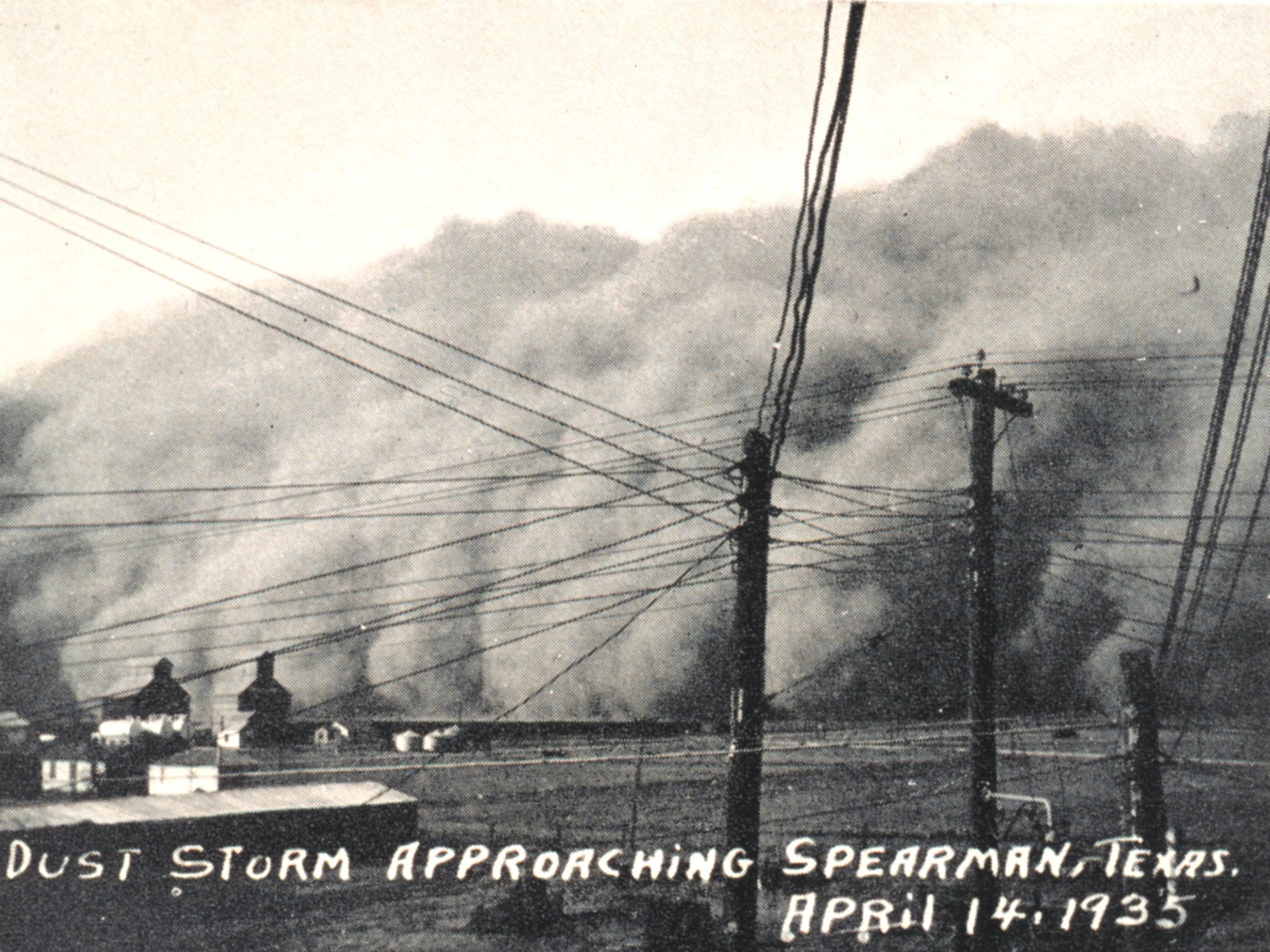
The "Black Sunday" dust storm approaches Spearman in northern Texas, April 14, 1935.

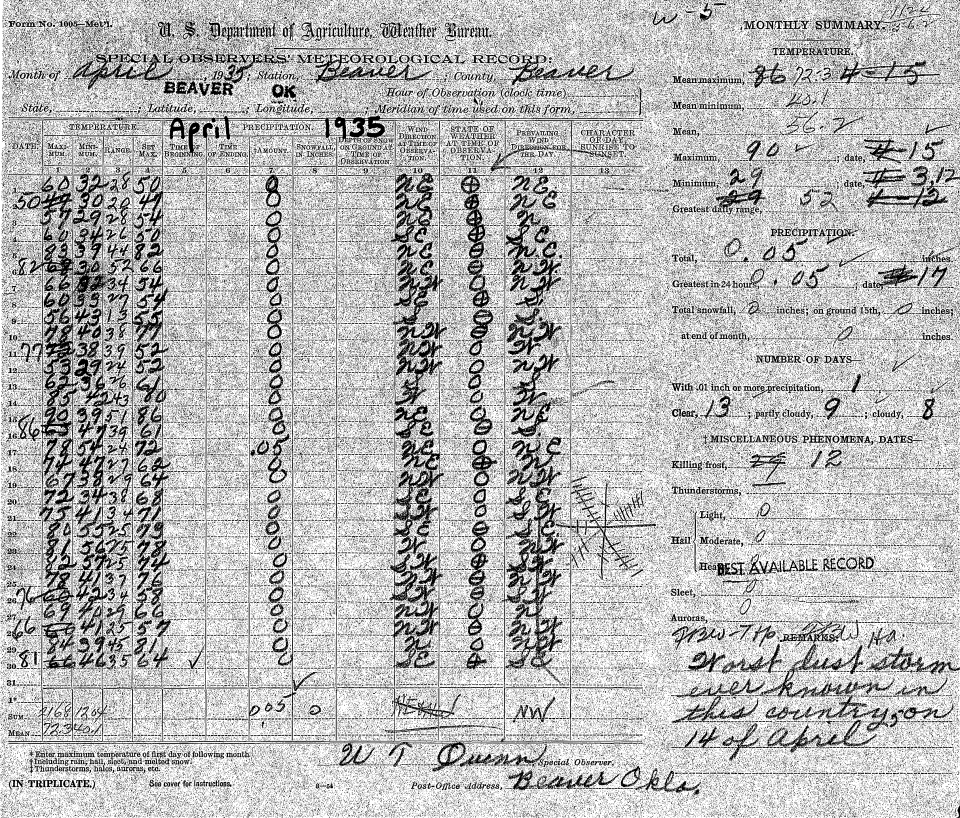
U.S. Weather Bureau, Beaver, OK, April 1935. Notice the mention of dust storms

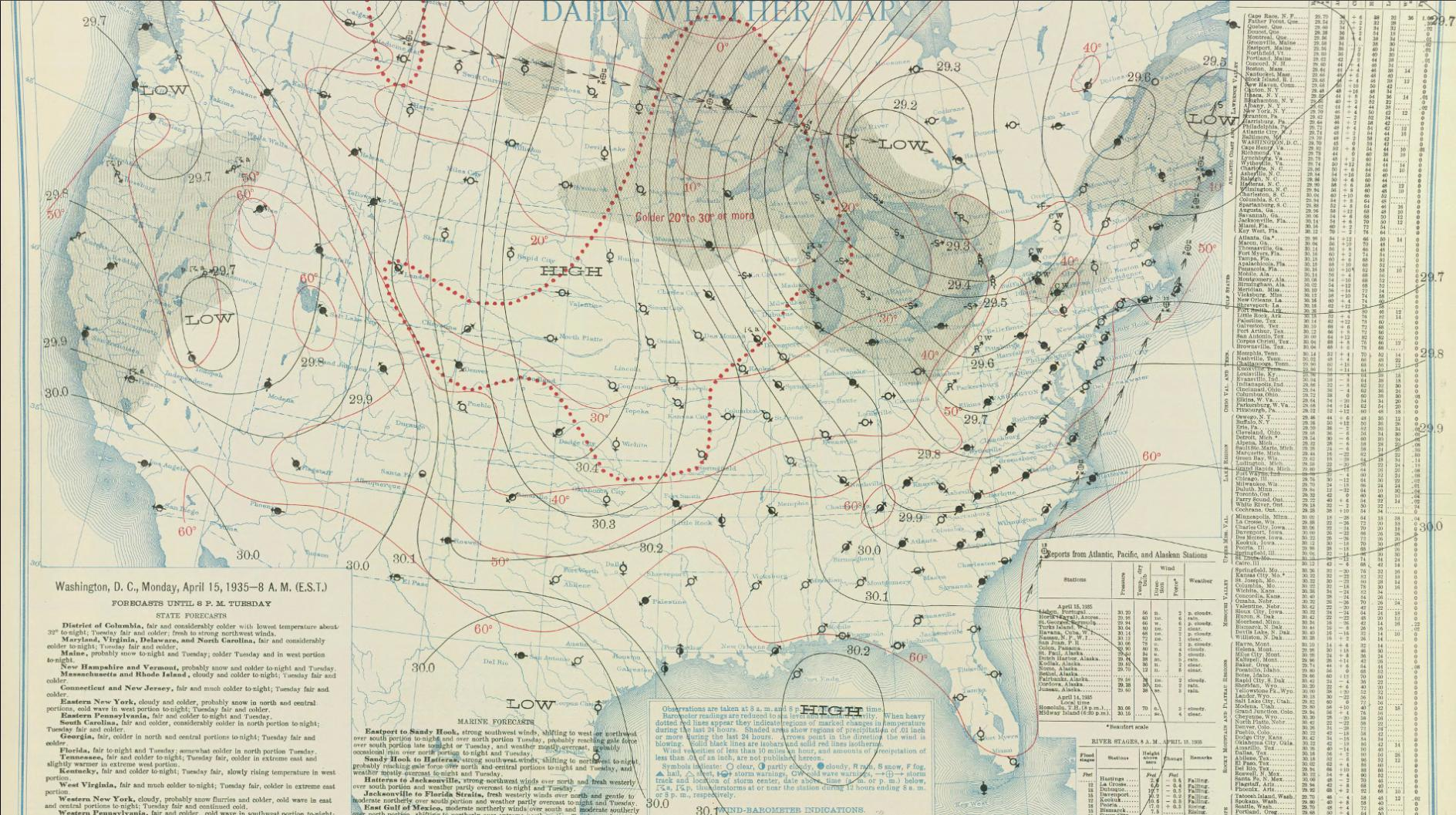
U.S. Weather Bureau Surface Analysis at 7:00 am CST on April 15, 1935, just after the Black Sunday dust storm

The term "Dust Bowl" initially described a series of dust storms that hit the prairies of Canada and the United States during the 1930s. It now describes the area in the United States most affected by the storms, including western Kansas, eastern Colorado, northeastern New Mexico, and the Oklahoma and Texas panhandles. The "black blizzards" started in the eastern states in 1930, affecting agriculture from Maine to Arkansas. By 1934, they had reached the Great Plains, stretching from North Dakota to Texas and from the Mississippi River Valley to the Rocky Mountains. The Dust Bowl as an area received its name following the disastrous Black Sunday storm in April 1935 when reporter Robert E. Geiger referred to the region as "the Dust Bowl" in his account.

== Causes ==
Cattle farming and sheep ranching had left much of the west devoid of natural grass and shrubs to anchor the soil, while over-farming and poor soil stewardship left the soil dehydrated and lacking in organic matter. A drought hit the United States in the 1930s, and the lack of rainfall, snowfall, and moisture in the air dried out the topsoil in most of the country's farming regions.

== Effects ==
The destruction caused by the dust storms, and especially by the storm on Black Sunday, killed multiple people and caused hundreds of thousands of people to relocate. Poor migrants from the American Southwest (known as "Okies" - though only about 20 percent were from Oklahoma) flooded California, overtaxing the state's health and employment infrastructure.

In 1935, after the massive damage caused by these storms, Congress passed the Soil Conservation Act, which established the Soil Conservation Service (SCS) as a permanent agency of the USDA. The SCS was created to guide land owners and land users in reducing soil erosion, improving forest and field land, and conserving and developing natural resources. This led to the Great Plains Shelterbelt project.

== Personal accounts of Black Sunday and other dust storms ==
During the 1930s, many residents of the Dust Bowl kept accounts and journals of their lives and the storms that hit their areas. Collections of accounts of the dust storms during the 1930s have been compiled over the years and are now available in book collections and online.

"People caught in their own yards grope for the doorstep. Cars come to a standstill, for no light in the world can penetrate that swirling murk…. The nightmare is deepest during the storms. But on the occasional bright day and the usual gray day we cannot shake from it. We live with the dust, eat it, sleep with it, watch it strip us of possessions and the hope of possessions."

— Avis D. Carlson, The New Republic

Lawrence Svobida was a wheat farmer in Kansas during the 1930s. He experienced the period of dust storms, and the effect that they had on the surrounding environment and the society. His observations and feelings are available in his Farming the Dust Bowl memoirs. Here he describes an approaching dust storm:

"… At other times a cloud is seen to be approaching from a distance of many miles. Already it has the banked appearance of a cumulus cloud, but it is black instead of white and it hangs low, seeming to hug the earth. Instead of being slow to change its form, it appears to be rolling on itself from the crest downward. As it sweeps onward, the landscape is progressively blotted out. Birds fly in terror before the storm, and only those that are strong of wing may escape. The smaller birds fly until they are exhausted, then fall to the ground, to share the fate of the thousands of jack rabbits which perish from suffocation."

The Black Sunday storm is detailed in the 2012 Ken Burns PBS documentary The Dust Bowl.

== In popular culture ==
Musicians and songwriters began to reflect the Dust Bowl and the events of the 1930s in their music. Woody Guthrie, a singer-songwriter from Oklahoma, wrote a variety of songs documenting his experiences living during the era of dust storms. Several were collected in his first album Dust Bowl Ballads. One of them, Great Dust Storm, describes the events of Black Sunday. An excerpt of the lyrics follows:

On the 14th day of April of 1935,
There struck the worst of dust storms that ever filled the sky.
You could see that dust storm comin', the cloud looked deathlike black,
And through our mighty nation, it left a dreadful track.
From Oklahoma City to the Arizona line,
Dakota and Nebraska to the lazy Rio Grande,
It fell across our city like a curtain of black rolled down,
We thought it was our judgement, we thought it was our doom.

American singer-songwriter Gillian Welch wrote the songs "April the 14th Part 1" and "Ruination Day Part 2", for her album Time (The Revelator) about Black Sunday sharing its date with the anniversary of the 1912 Sinking of the Titanic and the 1865 Assassination of Abraham Lincoln. It was inspired by Guthrie's Great "Dust Storm" and Blind Willie Johnson's "God Moves on the Water":

And the iceberg broke
And the Okies fled
And the Great Emancipator
Took a bullet in the back of the head
