= Great Bakersfield Dust Storm of 1977 =

Weather event in California, United States

- Date: December 19 - December 21
- Location: Southern San Joaquin Valley
- Also known as: Southern San Joaquin Valley Dust Storm
- Outcome: $40 million in damages
- Deaths: 5

The Great Bakersfield Dust Storm of 1977 (also known as the Southern San Joaquin Valley Dust Storm) was a severe dust storm in the Southern San Joaquin Valley, California. It started in the late evening on December 19, 1977 and ended in the afternoon of December 21. It resulted in 5 deaths and $40 million in damages (does not include subsequent agricultural losses).

== Background ==
December 19 started like most cold winter days. At 11:00 pm, the temperature was 44 °F (7 °C) with a light northwestern wind. By 11:30 pm, the air began to warm and the wind increased. Dust began to restrict visibility. Electrical power became sporadic throughout the city by early morning. By 9:00 am school was cancelled, and parents were asked to pick up their children because of the concern that school buses might tip over in the wind.

By late morning, the wind became a loud roar. Enough dust was in the air that it blocked out the sun. Roads into and out of the southern valley were closed. Only one TV station and two or three AM radio stations continued to have power and were able to broadcast. Also, since Bakersfield did not have a direct feed to national news broadcast, no one outside of the area knew the severity of the situation.

Wind continued to blow throughout the afternoon and evening. Swamp coolers were blown off the roofs of buildings. Windows were shattering and store signs were blowing in the wind. It was described as if a twister was unrolled and blew up the valley in a sheet. Farther north in the valley, Fresno was having typical December rain. When the dust reached the rain, it turned into mud. It fell in sheets from the sky.

People awoke the next morning to a dark sky. The wind had blown throughout the night and was continuing in the morning. Schools remained closed that day. By the afternoon, the wind began to subside, and the air started to clear.

== Aftermath ==
By the afternoon of December 21, people began to see the damage from the dust storm. The result was devastating. Trees, fences, and swamp coolers had blown down throughout the region. Below grade freeways, canals, and creeks were buried. Dirt had piled up on the south side of the buildings. Dust had seeped into cracks and crevices of buildings, filling the interior with a layer of dust. After several days, the roads were reopened and news reports started leaving the valley. People also started digging out and cleaning up. By spring, not all of the canals and creeks were cleared. As a result, the rain caused them to flood.

The storm resulted in five deaths and $40 million in damage. Over 25 million cubic feet (710,000 m^{3}) of topsoil from grazing land alone was moved. Wind was measured at 192 miles per hour (309 km/h) in Arvin (southeast of Bakersfield). In the foothills, the wind was measured at 189 miles per hour (304 km/h). In the mountain passes, it was 199 miles per hour (320 km/h).

== Cause ==
The great dust storm was caused by a number of events. There had been a drought in the region for several years, which caused the ground to be dry. Cotton had recently been plowed under (end of the season) but the winter crop had not taken root yet. This caused the soil to be loose.

The high winds were also caused by a series of events. Over the Great Basin, which is located in Nevada and Idaho, the air was very cold and heavy (high pressure). A very strong low pressure system was approaching the northwest coast of California. A mercury reading of 0.10 inHg (3.4 hPa)of pressure gradient force (difference of pressure between two points) is typically needed for a 12-mile-per-hour (19 km/h) northwestern wind. That day, the reading was 0.60 inHg (20 hPa).
