= Dust storm warning =

Weather warning in the United States

A dust storm warning (SAME code: DSW) is issued by the National Weather Service in the United States when blowing dust is expected to frequently reduce visibility to 1/4 mile (400 m) or less, generally with winds of 25 miles per hour (40 km/h) or more.

Beginning November 1, 2018, the National Weather Service issued these dust storm warnings in a polygon- and storm-based format, similar to the format of severe thunderstorm and tornado warnings. The zone-based dust storm warning was replaced by the new blowing dust warning. In addition to the new dust storm warning format, a lesser-impact dust advisory will be issued by the National Weather Service if the criteria for a warning are not met and if travel impacts are still expected.

== Example ==
The following is the first issuance of the new "storm-based" dust storm warnings, which is in use as of June 19, 2018.

BULLETIN - EAS ACTIVATION REQUESTED
Dust Storm Warning
National Weather Service Phoenix AZ
414 PM MST Thu Jul 5 2018

AZC013-021-060000-
/O.NEW.KPSR.DS.W.0002.180705T2314Z-180706T0000Z/
Maricopa AZ-Pinal AZ-
414 PM MST Thu Jul 5 2018

The National Weather Service in Phoenix has issued a

* Dust Storm Warning for...
  Maricopa County in south central Arizona...
  Pinal County in southeastern Arizona...

* Until 500 PM MST.

* At 414 PM MST, a wall of dust was along a line extending from near
  Gilbert to Randolph, moving west at 20 mph.

  HAZARD...Less than a quarter mile visibility with strong wind in
           excess of 40 mph.

  SOURCE...Public.

  IMPACT...Dangerous life-threatening travel.

* This includes the following highways...
  AZ Interstate 10 between mile markers 155 and 201.
  AZ Interstate 8 between mile markers 166 and 178.
  AZ Route 60 between mile markers 173 and 190.

Locations impacted include...
Mesa, Chandler, Gilbert, Tempe, Casa Grande, Coolidge, Sun Lakes,
East Mesa, Queen Creek, La Palma, San Tan Village Mall, San Tan
Valley, Seville, Freestone Park and Bapchule.

PRECAUTIONARY/PREPAREDNESS ACTIONS...

Dust storms lead to dangerous driving conditions with visibility
reduced to near zero. If driving, avoid dust storms if possible. If
caught in one, pull off the road, turn off your lights and keep your
foot off the brake.

Motorists should not drive into a dust storm. PULL ASIDE STAY ALIVE!

&&

LAT...LON 3280 11178 3279 11188 3340 11201 3342 11166
      3292 11142 3290 11146 3283 11154 3277 11177
TIME...MOT...LOC 2314Z 081DEG 17KT 3335 11172 3293 11152

$$

The following is an example of the previous-format dust storm warning issued by the National Weather Service in Tucson, Arizona.

URGENT - WEATHER MESSAGE 
NATIONAL WEATHER SERVICE TUCSON AZ
444 PM MST MON JUL 4 2011

AZZ502-504>506-050745-
/O.NEW.KTWC.DS.W.0003.110706T2300Z-110707T0100Z/
TOHONO O'ODHAM NATION-TUCSON METRO AREA-
SOUTH CENTRAL PINAL COUNTY-SOUTHEAST PINAL COUNTY-
INCLUDING THE CITIES OF...MARANA...PICACHO PEAK STATE PARK
444 PM MST MON JUL 4 2011

...DUST STORM WARNING IN EFFECT FROM 4 PM TO 6 PM MST WEDNESDAY...

THE NATIONAL WEATHER SERVICE IN TUCSON HAS ISSUED A DUST STORM
WARNING...WHICH IS IN EFFECT FROM 4 PM TO 6 PM MST WEDNESDAY. 

* TIMING...STRONG OUTFLOW WINDS FROM THUNDERSTORMS MOVING THROUGH
  EASTERN PIMA COUNTY WILL CONTINUE WEST INTO THE TOHONO OODHAM
  NATION AND NORTHWEST THROUGH PINAL COUNTY.

* WINDS...EAST GUSTS OF 30 TO 50 MPH.

* VISIBILITY...WILL BRIEFLY BE DOWN TO LESS THAN ONE-QUARTER OF A MILE.

* IMPACTS...MOTORISTS SHOULD BE PREPARED TO QUICKLY CHANGING
  CONDITIONS IN BLOWING DUST.

PRECAUTIONARY/PREPAREDNESS ACTIONS...

A DUST STORM WARNING MEANS SEVERELY LIMITED VISIBILITIES ARE EXPECTED
WITH BLOWING DUST. BLOWING DUST CAN QUICKLY REDUCE VISIBILITY...CAUSING
ACCIDENTS THAT MAY INVOLVE CHAIN COLLISIONS AND MULTIPLE PILEUPS.
IF DENSE DUST IS OBSERVED BLOWING ACROSS OR APPROACHING A ROADWAY...PULL
YOUR VEHICLE OFF THE PAVEMENT AS FAR AS POSSIBLE TO STOP. TURN OFF
THE LIGHTS...SET THE EMERGENCY BRAKE...AND TAKE YOUR FOOT OFF OF
THE BRAKE PEDAL TO ENSURE BRAKE LIGHTS ARE NOT ILLUMINATED.

STAY TUNED TO NOAA WEATHER RADIO...COMMERCIAL RADIO OR TELEVISION
STATIONS...OR YOUR CABLE TELEVISION PROVIDER FOR LATER STATEMENTS
CONCERNING THIS DUST STORM.

&&

== See also ==
- Severe weather terminology (United States)
