= Dust storm =

Meteorological phenomenon common in arid and semi-arid regions

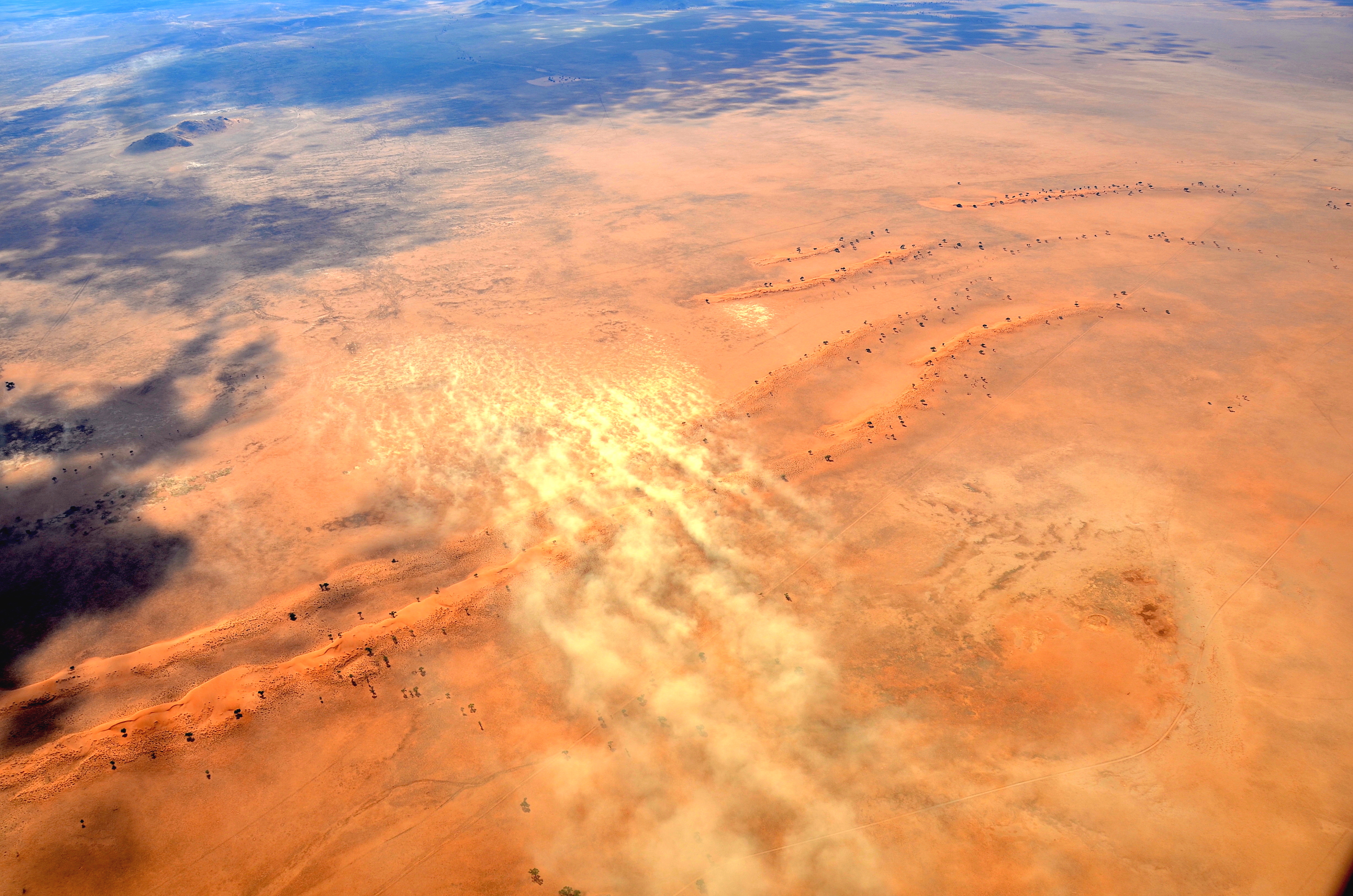
An aerial view of a sandstorm over the Namib Desert

A dust storm, also called a sandstorm, is a meteorological phenomenon common in arid and semi-arid regions. Dust storms arise when a gust front or other strong wind blows loose sand and dirt from a dry surface. Fine particles are transported by saltation and suspension, a process that moves soil from one place and deposits it in another. These storms can reduce visibility, disrupt transportation, and pose serious health risks. Over time, repeated dust storms can reduce agricultural productivity and contribute to desertification.

The arid regions of North Africa, the Middle East, Central Asia and China are the main terrestrial sources of airborne dust. It has been argued that poor management of Earth's drylands, such as neglecting the fallow system, are increasing the size and frequency of dust storms from desert margins and changing both the local and global climate, as well as impacting local economies.

The term sandstorm is used most often in the context of desert dust storms, especially in the Sahara Desert, or places where sand is a more prevalent soil type than dirt or rock, when, in addition to fine particles obscuring visibility, a considerable amount of larger sand particles are blown closer to the surface. The term dust storm is more likely to be used when finer particles are blown long distances, especially when the dust storm affects urban areas.

== Causes ==
Animation showing the global movement of dust from an Asian dust storm.

As the force of dust passing over loosely held particles increases, particles of sand first start to vibrate, then to move across the surface in a process called saltation. As they repeatedly strike the ground, they loosen and break off smaller particles of dust which then begin to travel in suspension. At wind speeds above that which causes the smallest to suspend, there will be a population of dust grains moving by a range of mechanisms: suspension, saltation and creep.

A study from 2008 finds that the initial saltation of sand particles induces a static electric field by friction. Saltating sand acquires a negative charge relative to the ground which in turn loosens more sand particles which then begin saltating. This process has been found to double the number of particles predicted by previous theories.

Particles become loosely held mainly due to a prolonged drought or arid conditions, and high wind speeds. Gust fronts may be produced by the outflow of rain-cooled air from an intense thunderstorm. Or, the wind gusts may be produced by a dry cold front: that is, a cold front that is moving into a dry air mass and is producing no precipitation—the type of dust storm which was common during the Dust Bowl years in the U.S. Following the passage of a dry cold front, convective instability resulting from cooler air riding over heated ground can maintain the dust storm initiated at the front.

In desert areas, dust and sand storms are most commonly caused by either thunderstorm outflows, or by strong pressure gradients which cause an increase in wind velocity over a wide area. The vertical extent of the dust or sand that is raised is largely determined by the stability of the atmosphere above the ground as well as by the weight of the particulates. In some cases, dust and sand may be confined to a relatively-shallow layer by a low-lying temperature inversion. In other instances, dust (but not sand) may be lifted as high as 6,000 m (20,000 ft).

Drought and wind contribute to the emergence of dust storms, as do poor farming and grazing practices by exposing the dust and sand to the wind. Wildfires can lead to dust storms as well.

One poor farming practice which contributes to dust storms is dryland farming. Particularly poor dryland farming techniques are intensive tillage or not having established crops or cover crops when storms strike at particularly vulnerable times prior to revegetation. In a semi-arid climate, these practices increase susceptibility to dust storms. However, soil conservation practices may be implemented to control wind erosion.

== Control ==
Starting in 1978, China has been creating a great green wall by planting trees in the Gobi desert to reclaim land from the desert. Results in one time period between 2009 and 2014 show a 20% reduction in the frequency of sandstorms. Great Green Wall (China)#cite note-15

== Physical and environmental effects ==
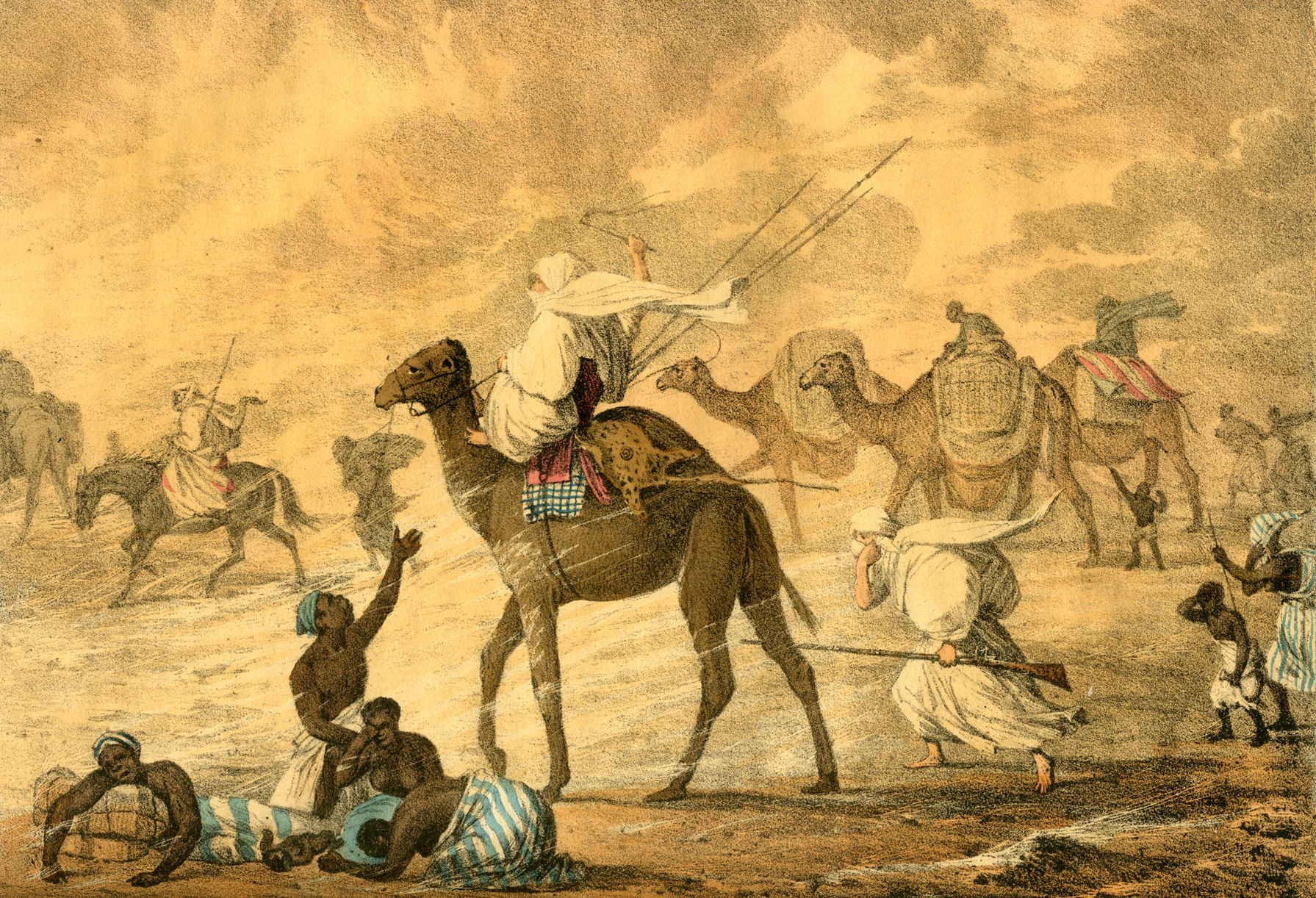
Dust storm in Sahara, painted by George Francis Lyon

A sandstorm can transport and carry large volumes of sand unexpectedly. Dust storms can carry large amounts of dust, with the leading edge being composed of a wall of thick dust as much as 1.6 km (5,200 ft) high. Dust and sand storms which come off the Sahara Desert are locally known as a simoom or simoon. The haboob is a sandstorm prevalent in the region of Sudan around Khartoum, with occurrences being most common in the summer.

The Sahara desert is a key source of dust storms, particularly the Bodélé Depression and an area covering the confluence of Mauritania, Mali, and Algeria. Sahara dust is frequently emitted into the Mediterranean atmosphere and transported by the winds sometimes as far north as central Europe and Great Britain.

Saharan dust storms have increased approximately 10-fold during the half-century since the 1950s, causing topsoil loss in Niger, Chad, northern Nigeria, and Burkina Faso. In Mauritania there were just two dust storms a year in the early 1960s; there are about 80 a year since 2007, according to English geographer Andrew Goudie, professor at the University of Oxford. Levels of Saharan dust coming off the east coast of Africa in June 2007 were five times those observed in June 2006, and were the highest observed since at least 1999, which may have cooled Atlantic waters enough to slightly reduce hurricane activity in late 2007.

Sydney shrouded in dust during the 2009 Australian dust storm.

=== Health impact ===
Dust storms are a major health hazard. Short-term effects of exposure to desert dust include immediate increased symptoms and worsening of the lung function in individuals with asthma, increased mortality and morbidity from long-transported dust from both Saharan and Asian dust storms suggesting that long-transported dust storm particles adversely affects the circulatory system. Dust pneumonia is the result of large amounts of dust being inhaled.

Prolonged and unprotected exposure of the respiratory system in a dust storm can also cause silicosis, which, if left untreated, will lead to asphyxiation; silicosis is an incurable condition that may also lead to lung cancer. There is also the danger of keratoconjunctivitis sicca ("dry eyes") which, in severe cases without immediate and proper treatment, can lead to blindness.

Dust storms have also been shown to increase the spread of disease across the globe. Bacteria and fungus spores in the ground are blown into the atmosphere by the storms with the minute particles and interact with urban air pollution.

=== Economic impact ===
Dust storms cause soil loss from the drylands, and worse, they preferentially remove organic matter and the nutrient-rich lightest particles, thereby reducing agricultural productivity. Also, the abrasive effect of the storm damages young crop plants. Dust storms also reduce visibility, affecting aircraft and road transportation.

Dust can also have beneficial effects where it deposits: Central and South American rainforests get significant quantities of mineral nutrients from the Sahara; iron-poor ocean regions get iron; and dust in Hawaii increases plantain growth. In northern China as well as the mid-western U.S., ancient dust storm deposits known as loess are highly fertile soils, but they are also a significant source of contemporary dust storms when soil-securing vegetation is disturbed.

== On Mars ==
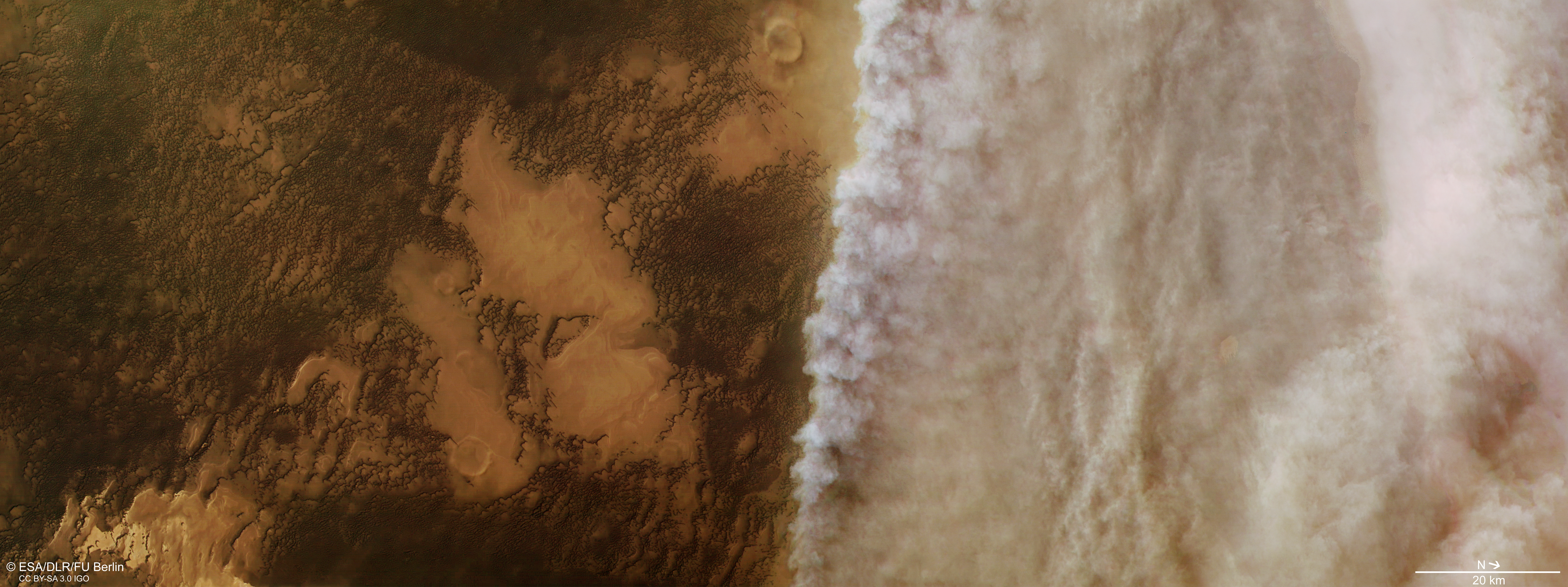
Orbital view of a Martian dust storm

Dust storms are not limited to Earth and have also been known to form on Mars. These dust storms can extend over larger areas than those on Earth, sometimes encircling the planet, with wind speeds as high as 25 m/s (60 mph). However, given Mars's much lower atmospheric pressure (roughly 1% that of Earth's), the intensity of Mars storms could never reach the hurricane-force winds experienced on Earth. Martian dust storms are formed when solar heating warms the Martian atmosphere and causes the air to move, lifting dust off the ground. The chance for storms is increased when there are great temperature variations like those seen at the equator during the Martian summer.

== See also ==
- Coccidioidomycosis – Fungal infection
- Dry line – Boundary between moist and dry air
- Dust storm warning – Weather warning in the United States
- Haboob – Type of intense dust storm
- Iberulite
- List of dust storms
- Mineral dust – Dust made from soil minerals
- Saharan Air Layer – Hot, dry and sometimes dust-laden atmospheric layer
- Shamal (wind) – Northwesterly wind blowing over Iraq and the Persian Gulf state
- Sirocco – Mediterranean wind
- Dust Bowl – 1930s period of severe dust storms in North America
